= Ice hockey at the 2006 Winter Olympics – Women's team rosters =

These are the team rosters of the nations that participated in the women's ice hockey tournament of the 2006 Winter Olympics.

== Canada ==
No.	Position	Name	S / C	Height	Weight	Birthdate	Birthplace	2004–05 team
2	F	Meghan Agosta	R	168	67	02/12/87	Windsor, Ontario	Windsor Jr. AA
10	F	Gillian Apps	L	183	80	11/02/83	North York, Ontario	Dartmouth Big Green women's ice hockey
17	F	Jennifer Botterill	L	175	69	05/01/79	Winnipeg, Manitoba	Toronto Aeros
77	F	Cassie Campbell – C	L	170	68	11/22/73	Richmond Hill, Ontario	Calgary Oval X-Treme
9	D	Gillian Ferrari	R	173	70	06/23/80	Richmond Hill, Ontario	Brampton Thunder
15	F	Danielle Goyette	L	170	67	01/30/66	Saint-Nazaire, Quebec	Calgary Oval X-Treme
16	F	Jayna Hefford	L	165	63	05/14/77	Trenton, Ontario	Brampton Thunder
4	D	Becky Kellar	L	170	67	01/01/75	Haldimand, Ontario	Oakville Ice
27	F	Gina Kingsbury	L	173	62	11/26/81	Uranium City, Saskatchewan	Montreal Axion
32	G	Charline Labonté	L	175	78	10/15/82	Greenfield Park, Quebec	Montreal Axion
3	D	Carla MacLeod	R	163	60	06/16/82	Edmonton, Alberta	Wisconsin Badgers women's ice hockey
13	D	Caroline Ouellette	L	180	78	05/25/79	Montreal, Quebec	University of Minnesota Duluth
7	F	Cherie Piper	R	168	76	06/29/81	Toronto, Ontario	Dartmouth Big Green women's ice hockey
11	D	Cheryl Pounder – A	R	168	65	06/21/76	Montreal, Quebec	Toronto Aeros
5	D	Colleen Sostorics	R	163	78	12/17/79	Regina, Saskatchewan	Calgary Oval X-Treme
33	G	Kim St-Pierre	L	175	71	12/14/78	Lasalle, Quebec	Quebec Avalanche
61	F	Vicky Sunohara – A	L	170	78	05/18/70	Scarborough, Ontario	Brampton Thunder
26	F	Sarah Vaillancourt	R	168	63	05/08/85	Fleurimont, Quebec	Harvard Crimson women's ice hockey
8	F	Katie Weatherston	R	158	61	04/06/83	Thunder Bay, Ontario	Dartmouth Big Green women's ice hockey
22	F	Hayley Wickenheiser – A	R	178	77	08/12/78	Shaunavon, Saskatchewan	Calgary Oval X-Treme

== Finland ==
No.	Position	Name	S / C	Height	Weight	Birthdate	Birthplace	2004–05 team
10	F	Sari Fisk – C	L	163	65	12/17/71	Pori	Espoo Blues
30	G	Maija Hassinen	L	161	52	01/02/84	Hämeenlinna	Ilves
15	F	Satu Hoikkala	R	165	63	01/14/80	Vantaa	Kärpät
5	D	Satu Kiipeli	L	174	72	12/24/80	Raahe	IHK
24	D	Kati Kovalainen – A	L	165	64	01/24/75	Leppävirta	IHK
2	D	Hanna Kuoppala	L	179	77	09/12/75	Jakobstad	Espoo Blues
3	D	Emma Laaksonen – A	L	159	60	12/17/81	Washington, D.C.	Espoo Blues
9	D	Terhi Mertanen	L	164	64	04/04/81	Joensuu	Kärpät
27	F	Marja-Helena Pälvilä	L	176	70	03/04/70	Oulu	Kärpät
11	F	Oona Parviainen	L	170	63	09/05/77	Kuopio	Espoo Blues
25	F	Mari Pehkonen	L	170	63	02/06/85	Tampere	University of Minnesota Duluth
4	D	Heidi Pelttari	L	165	68	08/02/85	Tampere	Ilves
29	F	Karoliina Rantamäki	L	163	68	02/23/78	Vantaa	Espoo Blues
1	G	Noora Räty	L	163	56	05/29/89	Espoo	Espoo Blues
12	F	Mari Saarinen	L	172	63	07/30/81	Kangasala	Ilves
21	F	Eveliina Similä	L	164	68	04/10/78	Toijala	Ilves
20	D	Saija Sirviö	L	171	57	12/29/82	Oulu	Kärpät
18	F	Nora Tallus	R	158	67	02/09/81	Kerava	IHK
22	F	Saara Tuominen	L	169	64	01/01/86	Ylöjärvi	Ilves
8	F	Satu Tuominen	L	163	61	11/19/85	Vantaa	Espoo Blues

== Germany ==
No.	Position	Name	Height	Weight	Birthdate	Birthplace	2004–05 team
81	F	Maritta Becker – A	168	61	03/11/81	Heilbronn	DSC Oberthurgau
25	F	Franziska Busch	163	59	10/20/85	Seesen	WSV Braunlage
66	F	Bettina Evers	168	66	08/17/81	Hanover	Grefrather EC
18	D	Susanne Fellner	160	57	02/26/85	Ravensburg	DSC Oberthurgau
24	F	Stephanie Frühwirt	166	64	07/22/80	Wolfratshausen	TV Kornwestheim
12	F	Susann Götz	164	62	12/14/82	Bad Muskau	OSC Berlin
29	F	Claudia Grundmann – A	177	69	04/22/76	Berlin	OSC Berlin
30	G	Jennifer Harss	173	65	07/14/87	Füssen	ECDC Memmingen
10	F	Nikola Holmes	177	72	02/18/81	Bellflower, California	OSC Berlin
23	D	Sabrina Kruck	167	61	11/03/81	Starnberg	SC Riessersee
28	F	Andrea Lanzl	161	60	10/08/87	Starnberg	EC Bergkamen, Bergkamen
21	F	Michaela Lanzl	161	55	02/21/83	Starnberg	University of Minnesota Duluth
19	D	Christina Oswald – C	172	75	07/26/73	Garmisch-Partenkirchen	SC Riessersee
15	D	Nina Ritter	168	60	01/26/81	Hamburg	Hamburger SV
14	F	Anja Scheytt	174	69	12/05/80	Mannheim	OSC Berlin
17	F	Sara Seiler	169	61	01/25/83	Hausham	DSC Oberthurgau
16	F	Denise Soesilo	168	50	05/10/87	Hamburg	Hamburger SV
2	D	Jenny Tamas	172	63	01/18/90	Herford	ERV Schweinfurt
13	G	Stephanie Wartosch-Kürten	172	68	11/12/78	Düsseldorf	OSC Berlin
9	F	Raffaela Wolf	168	52	06/20/78	Dinslaken	ESC Planegg-Würmtal

== Italy ==
No.	Position	Name	Height	Weight	Birthdate	Birthplace	2004–05 team
2	D	Michela Angeloni	167	67	09/25/84	Bergamo	HC Lario Halloween Como
12	F	Evelyn Bazzanella – C	168	58	06/15/76	Bolzano	HC Eagles Bolzano
9	D	Valentina Bettarini	170	66	06/29/90	Bolzano	HC Eagles Bolzano
8	F	Celeste Bissardella	166	58	10/17/88	Bolzano	HC Eagles Bolzano
29	F	Heidi Caldart	167	56	10/19/83	Feltre	Agordo Hockey
18	F	Silvia Carignano	160	59	08/11/87	Pinerolo	HC All Stars Piemonte
17	F	Diana Da Rugna	160	53	10/16/89	Feltre	Agordo Hockey
25	F	Anna De la Forest	163	47	06/24/88	Turin	HC All Stars Piemonte
19	D	Nadia De Nardin	170	67	11/14/75	Agordo	Agordo Hockey
7	D	Linda De Rocco	162	53	01/03/86	Belluno	Agordo Hockey
14	D	Rebecca Fiorese	162	61	09/04/80	Milan	HC Lario Halloween Como
11	F	Sabina Florian – A	168	68	05/28/83	Bolzano	SC Riessersee
1	G	Luana Frasnelli	162	54	07/25/75	Bolzano	HC Eagles Bolzano
13	D	Manuela Friz – A	156	51	08/16/78	Agordo	Agordo Hockey
24	F	Waltraud Kaser	169	61	07/03/80	Brixen	HC Eagles Bolzano
10	F	Maria Michaela Leitner	161	54	12/30/81	Sterzing	HC Eagles Bolzano
26	G	Debora Montanari	159	58	10/17/80	Pinerolo	HC All Stars Piemonte
16	D	Katharina Sparer	163	52	02/22/90	Bolzano	HC Eagles Bolzano
27	F	Silvia Toffano	163	52	01/05/85	Venezia	HC Eagles Bolzano
23	D	Sabrina Viel	166	53	02/17/73	Belluno	Agordo Hockey

== Russian Federation ==
The following is the Russian roster in the women's ice hockey tournament of the 2006 Winter Olympics.

Head coach: (Russia) Alexey Kalintsev Assistant coach: (Russia) Alexey Zherebtsov

No.	Pos.	Name	Height	Weight	Birthdate	Birthplace	2005–06 team
33	G	Nadezhda Aleksandrova	1.72 m (5 ft 8 in)	67 kg (148 lb)	3 January 1986	Moscow, Soviet Union	(Russia) SKIF Moscow
2	D	Maria Barykina	1.70 m (5 ft 7 in)	60 kg (130 lb)	9 December 1973	Moscow, Soviet Union	(Russia) Tornado Dmitrov
23	F	Tatiana Burina	1.63 m (5 ft 4 in)	65 kg (143 lb)	20 March 1980	Novosibirsk, Soviet Union	(Russia) Tornado Dmitrov
27	D	Elena Byalkovskaya	1.79 m (5 ft 10 in)	82 kg (181 lb)	22 March 1977	Moscow, Soviet Union	(Russia) SKIF Moscow
20	G	Irina Gashennikova	1.60 m (5 ft 3 in)	66 kg (146 lb)	11 May 1975	Pushkino, Soviet Union	(Russia) SKIF Moscow
24	F	Iya Gavrilova	1.73 m (5 ft 8 in)	61 kg (134 lb)	3 September 1987	Krasnoyarsk, Soviet Union	(Russia) SKIF Moscow
12	F	Yulia Gladysheva	1.66 m (5 ft 5 in)	56 kg (123 lb)	4 December 1981	Moscow, Soviet Union	(Russia) SKIF Moscow
16	D	Alexandra Kapustina	1.65 m (5 ft 5 in)	71 kg (157 lb)	7 April 1984	Pervouralsk, Soviet Union	(Russia) Spartak-Merkury Yekaterinburg
4	D	Alena Khomich	1.68 m (5 ft 6 in)	56 kg (123 lb)	26 February 1981	Pervouralsk, Soviet Union	(Russia) Spartak-Merkury Yekaterinburg
10	F	Larisa Mishina	1.68 m (5 ft 6 in)	80 kg (180 lb)	10 September 1975	Moscow, Soviet Union	(Russia) SKIF Moscow
25	F	Ekaterina Pashkevich – A	1.80 m (5 ft 11 in)	80 kg (180 lb)	19 September 1972	Moscow, Soviet Union	(Russia) Tornado Dmitrov
15	D	Olga Permyakova	1.68 m (5 ft 6 in)	66 kg (146 lb)	12 April 1982	Chelyabinsk, Soviet Union	(Russia) Tornado Dmitrov
14	D	Kristina Petrovskaya	1.68 m (5 ft 6 in)	63 kg (139 lb)	3 June 1980	Moscow, Soviet Union	(Russia) Tornado Dmitrov
29	D	Zhanna Schelchkova – C	1.64 m (5 ft 5 in)	60 kg (130 lb)	10 February 1969	Moscow, Soviet Union	(Russia) SKIF Moscow
5	F	Galina Skiba	1.60 m (5 ft 3 in)	65 kg (143 lb)	9 May 1984	Kharkiv, Ukrainian SSR, Soviet Union	(Russia) SKIF Moscow
17	F	Ekaterina Smolentseva – A	1.70 m (5 ft 7 in)	65 kg (143 lb)	15 September 1981	Pervouralsk, Soviet Union	(Russia) Tornado Dmitrov
7	F	Ekaterina Smolina	1.58 m (5 ft 2 in)	55 kg (121 lb)	8 October 1988	Ust-Kamenogorsk, Kazakh SSR, Soviet Union	(Russia) SKIF Moscow
11	F	Tatiana Sotnikova	1.66 m (5 ft 5 in)	58 kg (128 lb)	20 January 1981	Moscow, Soviet Union	(Russia) SKIF Moscow
21	F	Svetlana Trefilova	1.65 m (5 ft 5 in)	60 kg (130 lb)	20 May 1973	Sverdlovsk, Soviet Union	(Russia) Tornado Dmitrov
28	F	Oxana Tretiyakova	1.64 m (5 ft 5 in)	75 kg (165 lb)	10 March 1979	Krasnoyarsk, Soviet Union	(Russia) SKIF Moscow

== Sweden ==
Position	Name	Height	Weight	Birthdate	Birthplace	2005–06 team
G	Cecilia Andersson	179 cm (5 ft 10 1/2 in)	74 kg (163 lb)	4 October 1982	Väddö	Concordia Stingers
G	Kim Martin	167 cm (5 ft 5 1/2 in)	71 kg (157 lb)	28 February 1986	Stockholm	AIK
D	Gunilla Andersson – A	170 cm (5 ft 7 in)	69 kg (152 lb)	26 April 1975	Skutskär	Mälarhöjden/Bredäng Hockey
D	Jenni Asserholt	172 cm (5 ft 7 1/2 in)	74 kg (163 lb)	8 April 1988	Örebro	Örebro HK
D	Joa Elfsberg	177 cm (5 ft 9 1/2 in)	73 kg (161 lb)	30 July 1979	Valbo	Brynäs IF
D	Emma Eliasson	166 cm (5 ft 5 1/2 in)	70 kg (150 lb)	12 June 1989	Kiruna	Modo Hockey
D	Ylva Lindberg	166 cm (5 ft 5 1/2 in)	67 kg (148 lb)	29 June 1976	Umeå	Mälarhöjden/Bredäng Hockey
F	Ann-Louise Edstrand	178 cm (5 ft 10 in)	67 kg (148 lb)	25 April 1975	Örnsköldsvik	Mälarhöjden/Bredäng Hockey
F	Erika Holst – C	179 cm (5 ft 10 1/2 in)	80 kg (180 lb)	8 April 1979	Varberg	Mälarhöjden/Bredäng Hockey
F	Nanna Jansson	172 cm (5 ft 7 1/2 in)	67 kg (148 lb)	7 July 1983	Gävle	Brynäs IF
F	Jenny Lindqvist	169 cm (5 ft 6 1/2 in)	70 kg (150 lb)	21 July 1978	Stockholm	Mälarhöjden/Bredäng Hockey
F	Kristina Lundberg	172 cm (5 ft 7 1/2 in)	86 kg (190 lb)	10 June 1985	Husum	Modo Hockey
D	Frida Nevalainen	164 cm (5 ft 4 1/2 in)	65 kg (143 lb)	27 January 1987	Umeå	Modo Hockey
F	Emilie O'Konor	170 cm (5 ft 7 in)	70 kg (150 lb)	21 February 1983	Danderyd	AIK
F	Maria Rooth – A	175 cm (5 ft 9 in)	75 kg (165 lb)	2 November 1979	Ängelholm	Mälarhöjden/Bredäng Hockey
F	Danijela Rundqvist	176 cm (5 ft 9 1/2 in)	71 kg (157 lb)	26 September 1984	Stockholm	AIK
F	Therése Sjölander	173 cm (5 ft 8 in)	69 kg (152 lb)	4 May 1981	Sollefteå	Modo Hockey
F	Katarina Timglas	168 cm (5 ft 6 in)	64 kg (141 lb)	24 November 1985	Malmö	AIK
F	Anna Vikman	168 cm (5 ft 6 in)	74 kg (163 lb)	13 January 1981	Överkalix	Modo Hockey
F	Pernilla Winberg	164 cm (5 ft 4 1/2 in)	60 kg (130 lb)	24 February 1989	Limhamn	AIK

== Switzerland ==
No.	Position	Name	Height	Weight	Birthdate	Birthplace	2005–06 Team
22	F	Silvia Bruggmann	168	54	02/20/78	Lütisburg	EV Zug
10	D	Nicole Bullo	160	54	05/18/87	Bellinzona	HC Lugano
21	F	Sandra Cattaneo	166	64	01/25/75	Zürich	EHC Illnau-Effretikon
4	F	Daniela Diaz – A	170	66	06/16/82	Baar	EV Zug
25	G	Patricia Elsmore-Sautter	166	67	02/28/79	Schaffhausen	Roseau / United States
11	D	Angela Frautschi	168	67	06/05/87	Interlaken	DHC Langenthal
15	D	Ramona Fuhrer – C	163	68	04/13/79	Aarberg Be	DHC Lyss
9	D	Ruth Künzle	166	65	03/29/72	Gaiserwald-Waldkirch	HC Lugano
20	F	Kathrin Lehmann – A	172	68	02/27/80	Zürich	Lady Kodiaks Kornwestheim
23	D	Monika Leuenberger	180	82	04/11/73	Zürich	EV Zug
75	F	Jeanette Marty	173	74	08/11/75	Zug	EV Zug
6	D	Julia Marty	170	72	04/16/88	Zürich	EV Zug
69	F	Stefanie Marty	167	70	04/16/88	Zürich	EV Zug
66	F	Christine Meier	169	66	05/24/86	Buelach	EHC Illnau-Effretikon
55	D	Prisca Mosimann	184	75	03/19/75	Langenthal	DHC Langenthal
24	F	Sandrine Ray	163	60	05/11/83	Orbe	HC Lugano
49	F	Rachel Rochat	180	68	09/10/72	Summit, New Jersey	Needham / USA
27	F	Laura Ruhnke	172	74	12/25/83	Biel	HC Lugano
41	G	Florence Schelling	174	73	03/09/89	Zürich	GCK Lions
17	F	Tina Schumacher	160	60	03/20/78	Biel	DHC Lyss

== United States ==
No.	Pos.	Name	Height	Weight	Birthdate	Birthplace	2004–05 team
8	D	Caitlin Cahow	162 cm (5 ft 4 in)	70 kg (150 lb)	20 May 1985 (aged 20)	New Haven, Connecticut	Harvard Crimson women's ice hockey
13	F	Julie Chu	173 cm (5 ft 8 in)	68 kg (150 lb)	13 March 1982 (aged 23)	Fairfield, Connecticut	Harvard Crimson women's ice hockey
22	F	Natalie Darwitz	160 cm (5 ft 3 in)	64 kg (141 lb)	13 October 1983 (aged 22)	Eagan, Minnesota	Minnesota Golden Gophers women's ice hockey
31	G	Pam Dreyer	165 cm (5 ft 5 in)	70 kg (150 lb)	9 August 1981 (aged 24)	Eagle River, Alaska	Brown Bears women's ice hockey
25	F	Tricia Dunn-Luoma	173 cm (5 ft 8 in)	66 kg (146 lb)	25 April 1975 (aged 30)	Derry, New Hampshire	New Hampshire Wildcats women's ice hockey
9	D	Molly Engstrom	175 cm (5 ft 9 in)	77 kg (170 lb)	1 March 1983 (aged 22)	Siren, Wisconsin	Wisconsin Badgers women's ice hockey
30	G	Chanda Gunn	170 cm (5 ft 7 in)	63 kg (139 lb)	27 January 1980 (aged 26)	Huntington Beach, California	Northeastern Huskies women's ice hockey
11	D	Jamie Hagerman	175 cm (5 ft 9 in)	77 kg (170 lb)	7 May 1981 (aged 24)	North Andover, Massachusetts	Harvard Crimson women's ice hockey
10	F	Kim Insalaco	165 cm (5 ft 5 in)	59 kg (130 lb)	4 November 1980 (aged 25)	Rochester, New York	Brown Bears women's ice hockey
18	F	Kathleen Kauth	173 cm (5 ft 8 in)	68 kg (150 lb)	28 March 1979 (aged 26)	Saratoga Springs, New York	Brown Bears women's ice hockey
3	D	Courtney Kennedy	175 cm (5 ft 9 in)	86 kg (190 lb)	29 March 1979 (aged 26)	Woburn, Massachusetts	Minnesota Golden Gophers women's ice hockey
20	F	Katie King	175 cm (5 ft 9 in)	77 kg (170 lb)	24 May 1975 (aged 30)	Salem, New Hampshire	Brown Bears women's ice hockey
19	F	Kristin King	163 cm (5 ft 4 in)	61 kg (134 lb)	21 July 1979 (aged 26)	Piqua, Ohio	Dartmouth Big Green women's ice hockey
27	F	Sarah Parsons	173 cm (5 ft 8 in)	64 kg (141 lb)	27 July 1987 (aged 18)	Dover, Massachusetts	Noble & Greenough High School
12	F	Jenny Potter	163 cm (5 ft 4 in)	66 kg (146 lb)	12 January 1979 (aged 27)	Edina, Minnesota	Minnesota Duluth Bulldogs women's ice hockey
6	D	Helen Resor	178 cm (5 ft 10 in)	70 kg (150 lb)	18 October 1985 (aged 20)	Greenwich, Connecticut	Yale Bulldogs women's ice hockey
4	D	Angela Ruggiero – A	175 cm (5 ft 9 in)	84 kg (185 lb)	3 January 1980 (aged 26)	Harper Woods, Michigan	Harvard Crimson women's ice hockey
14	F	Kelly Stephens	168 cm (5 ft 6 in)	59 kg (130 lb)	4 June 1983 (aged 22)	Seattle, Washington	Minnesota Golden Gophers women's ice hockey
5	D	Lyndsay Wall	173 cm (5 ft 8 in)	70 kg (150 lb)	12 May 1985 (aged 20)	Churchville, New York	Minnesota Golden Gophers women's ice hockey
7	F	Krissy Wendell – C	168 cm (5 ft 6 in)	70 kg (150 lb)	12 September 1981 (aged 24)	Brooklyn Park, Minnesota	Minnesota Golden Gophers women's ice hockey
