= Ice hockey at the 2006 Winter Olympics – Women's qualification =

Qualification for the women's tournament at the 2006 Winter Olympics was determined by the IIHF World Ranking following the 2004 Women's World Ice Hockey Championships. The top four teams in the World Ranking received automatic berths into the Olympics, Italy received an automatic berth as host, and all other teams had an opportunity to qualify for the remaining three spots in the Olympics.

== Qualified Teams ==
Event	Date	Location	Vacancies	Qualified
2004 IIHF World Ranking	5 March 2001 – 6 April 2004	(Canada) Halifax	4	Canada; United States; Finland; Sweden
Qualification tournament	11–13 November 2004	(Russia) Podolsk	1	Russia
Qualification tournament	11–14 November 2004	(Germany) Bad Tölz	1	Germany
Qualification tournament	11–14 November 2004	(China) Beijing	1	Switzerland
Host			1	Italy
TOTAL			8	

Notes

1. ^{a} 2004 IIHF World Ranking were comprising the following events: 2000 World Championship, 2001 World Championship, 2002 Winter Olympic Games and 2004 World Championship.
2. ^{b} Halifax was the site for 2004 World Championship; at the conclusion of the tournament the ranking were finalized with regards to the qualification slots.

== IIHF World Ranking ==
Qualified directly to Olympic Tournament
Qualification tournament

Rank	Team	WC 2004 (100%)	OLY 2002 (75%)	WC 2001 (50%)	WC 2000 (25%)	Total
1	Canada	1200	1200	1200	1200	3000
2	United States	1160	1160	1160	1160	2900
3	Finland	1120	1100	1100	1120	2775
4	Sweden	1100	1120	1020	1100	2725
5	Russia	1060	1060	1120	1060	2680
6	Germany	1040	1040	1060	1020	2605
7	China	1020	1020	1040	1040	2565
8	Switzerland	1000	960	960	940	2435
9	Kazakhstan	940	1000	1000	960	2430
10	Japan	980	940	940	1000	2405
11	Czech Republic	920		920	840	1590
12	Latvia	900		860	860	1545
13	France	880		880	880	1540
14	Norway	860		840	920	1510
15	North Korea	840		900	800	1490
16	Denmark	820		820	900	1455
17	Italy	800		760	820	1385
18	Slovakia	780		800	780	1375
19	Netherlands	760		780	720	1330
20	Great Britain	720		740	760	1280
21	Australia	740		720	680	1270
22	Belgium	640		700	740	1175
23	Hungary	660		660	700	1165
24	Slovenia	680		620		990
25	Romania	620		640		940
26	Austria	700				700
27	South Korea	600				600
28	South Africa			680	660	505

- North Korea and Denmark chose not to participate in Olympic qualifying.

== Qualification Tournaments ==
Three round-robins were played from 11 to 14 November 2004. The teams ranked 5th, 6th and 7th reserved the right to host these tournaments. The three group winners qualified for the Olympic tournament.

=== Group A ===
Games were played in Podolsk, Russia.

Pos	Team	Pld	W	D	L	GF	GA	GD	Pts	Qualification
1	Russia (H)	2	2	0	0	6	2	+4	4	2006 Winter Olympics
2	Japan	2	1	0	1	6	4	+2	2	
3	Czech Republic	2	0	0	2	1	7	−6	0	

Source: IIHF.com
(H) Hosts

11 November 2004; 18:30	Czech Republic	0–3 (0–3, 0–0, 0–0)	Russia	Vityaz Ice Palace, Podolsk; Attendance: 1,700

Game reference

Petra Šmardová
Goalies
Mariya Onolbayeva

Linesmen:
Marina Konstantinova
Johanna Suban

0–1	09:22 – Dil (Khomich)
0–2	12:27 – Tretiakova (Gavrilova) (PP)
0–3	17:10 – Smolentseva (Dil)

8 min
Penalties
8 min
6
Shots
44

12 November 2004; 18:30	Japan	4–1 (0–1, 2–0, 2–0)	Czech Republic	Vityaz Ice Palace, Podolsk; Attendance: 700

Game reference

Tomoko Fujimoto
Goalies
Petra Šmardová

Linesmen:
Tanja Karahastsu
Marina Konstantinova

	0–1	14:37 – Vojáková (Honická) (PP)
Tamada (Togawa) – 33:06	1–1
Kawashima (Hatanaka) – 37:03	2–1
Takashima (Sakagami) – 41:15	3–1
Nihonyanagi (Ibe) – 43:45	4–1

14 min
Penalties
8 min
25
Shots
10

13 November 2004; 17:00	Russia	3–2 (2–0, 1–1, 0–1)	Japan	Vityaz Ice Palace, Podolsk; Attendance: 2,100

Game reference

Mariya Onolbayeva
Goalies
Tomoko Fujimoto

Linesmen:
Johanna Suban
Tanja Karahastsu

Shchelchkova (Gavrilova) – 06:45	1–0
Gladysheva (Sotnikova) – 16:26	2–0
Trefilova (Tretiakova) – 22:39	3–0
	3–1	36:43 – Tsuchida (Yamane)
	3–2	59:05 – Kubo (Wada) (PP)

43 min
Penalties
12 min
31
Shots
28

=== Group B ===
Games were played in Bad Tölz, Germany.

Pos	Team	Pld	W	D	L	GF	GA	GD	Pts	Qualification
1	Germany (H)	3	3	0	0	20	2	+18	6	2006 Winter Olympics
2	Kazakhstan	3	2	0	1	21	6	+15	4	
3	Latvia	3	1	0	2	13	11	+2	2	
4	Slovenia	3	0	0	3	3	38	−35	0	

Source: IIHF.com
(H) Hosts

11 November 2004; 16:00	Kazakhstan	17–0 (4–0, 8–0, 5–0)	Slovenia	Hacker-Pschorr Arena, Bad Tölz; Attendance: 99

Game reference

Natalya Trunova
Yelena Kuznetsova
Goalies
Hedvika Korbar
Špela Globočnik
Referees:
Debbie Hengst
Joy Tottman
Linesmen:
Nina Hahnel
Malene Skovbakke

Potapova (Kryukova) – 06:40	1–0
Maltseva (Yakovchuk) – 10:46	2–0
Kryukova – 12:13	3–0
Yakovchuk (Kryukova, Adyyeva) (PP) – 15:51	4–0
Yakovchuk (Adyyeva) (PP) – 24:03	5–0
Alexeyeva (Sazonova) (PP) – 26:16	6–0
Alexeyeva (Maltseva) – 27:38	7–0
Atarskaya – 28:38	8–0
Potapova (Alexeyeva) – 30:22	9–0
Potapova (Konysheva) – 32:56	10–0
Atarskaya (Potapova, Alexeyeva) – 33:53	11–0
Sazonova (Potapova) – 35:24	12–0
Yakovchuk (Kryukova) – 45:27	13–0
Atarskaya (Konysheva) – 47:35	14–0
Potapova (Sazonova) – 49:40	15–0
Yakovchuk (Maltseva) – 52:45	16–0
Potapova – 57:53	17–0

6 min
Penalties
8 min
99
Shots
21

11 November 2004; 19:30	Latvia	1–5 (1–2, 0–1, 0–2)	Germany	Hacker-Pschorr Arena, Bad Tölz; Attendance: 425

Game reference

Lolita Andriševska
Goalies
Stephanie Wartosch-Kürten
Referees:
Katerina Ivicicova
Joy Tottman
Linesmen:
Annesofie Boniface
Klara Quagliato

	0–1	04:52 – Wolf (Oswald)
	0–2	06:13 – Becker (Oswald) (PP)
Stolte (Lukaševiča) – 18:54	1–2
	1–3	23:33 – Becker (Lanzl)
	1–4	58:08 – Grundmann (Scheytt)
	1–5	59:04 – Seiler (Lanzl, Becker)

4 min
Penalties
4 min
19
Shots
51

13 November 2004; 15:00	Kazakhstan	4–1 (1–0, 2–0, 1–1)	Latvia	Hacker-Pschorr Arena, Bad Tölz; Attendance: 140

Game reference

Natalya Trunova
Goalies
Lolita Andriševska
Referee:
Katerina Ivicicova
Linesmen:
Annesofia Boniface
Nina Hahnel

Potapova (Alexeyeva) – 13:08	1–0
Atarskaya (Alexeyeva) – 21:18	2–0
Potapova (Sazonova) (SH) – 24:24	3–0
	3–1	40:27 – Geca-Miljone
Potapova (Sazonova) (PP) – 49:30	4–1

16 min
Penalties
8 min
47
Shots
26

13 November 2004; 18:30	Germany	10–1 (3–0, 4–0, 3–1)	Slovenia	Hacker-Pschorr Arena, Bad Tölz; Attendance: 575

Game reference

Viona Harrer
Goalies
Špela Globočnik
Referee:
Joy Tottman
Linesmen:
Malene Skovbakke
Petra Slivkova

Wolf (Evers) – 08:44	1–0
Götz (Kruck) (SH) – 13:54	2–0
Evers (Busch) – 16:17	3–0
Grundmann (Fellner, Götz) (PP) – 34:14	4–0
Evers (Busch) – 37:44	5–0
Ritter (Scheytt, Kruck) – 38:56	6–0
Seiler (Becker) – 39:48	7–0
Lanzl – 48:00	8–0
Lanzl (Becker) – 48:49	9–0
	9–1	51:55 – Ažman (Kavčič)
Scheytt (Ritter) – 58:26	10–1

18 min
Penalties
2 min
73
Shots
9

14 November 2004; 14:30	Slovenia	2–11 (1–2, 0–7, 1–2)	Latvia	Hacker-Pschorr Arena, Bad Tölz; Attendance: 67

Game reference

Hedvika Korbar
Špela Globočnik
Goalies
Lolita Andriševska
Referee:
Debbie Hengst
Linesmen:
Klara Quagliato
Petra Slivkova

	0–1	01:01 – Stolte (Lukaševiča)
Eržen (Pren) – 02:46	1–1
	1–2	04:08 – Koka (SH)
	1–3	22:26 – Geca-Miljone (Koka, Švalbe) (PP)
	1–4	23:34 – Karpova (Stolte)
	1–5	26:42 – Bičevska (Lukaševiča, Stolte) (PP2)
	1–6	30:44 – Koka
	1–7	32:57 – Koka (Geca-Miljone) (SH)
	1–8	38:07 – Pētersone (Mihejeva)
	1–9	38:25 – Geca-Miljone (Koka)
	1–10	41:47 – Stolte (Lukaševiča)
	1–11	50:03 – Geca-Miljone (Koka) (SH)
Ažman (SH) – 59:26	2–11

14 min
Penalties
28 min
14
Shots
40

14 November 2004; 18:00	Germany	5–0 (1–0, 2–0, 2–0)	Kazakhstan	Hacker-Pschorr Arena, Bad Tölz; Attendance: 1,498

Game reference

Stephanie Wartosch-Kürten
Goalies
Natalya Trunova
Referee:
Joy Tottman
Linesmen:
Annesofie Boniface
Malene Skovakke

Becker (Kruck, Lanzl) (PP2) – 04:21	1–0
Lanzl (Ritter, Grundmann) – 28:11	2–0
Seiler (Becker, Lanzl) – 31:16	3–0
Becker (Seiler) – 45:01	4–0
Wolf (Evers) (PP) – 53:41	5–0

10 min
Penalties
28 min
42
Shots
15

=== Group C ===
Games were played in Beijing, China.

Pos	Team	Pld	W	D	L	GF	GA	GD	Pts	Qualification
1	Switzerland	3	3	0	0	15	5	+10	6	2006 Winter Olympics
2	China (H)	3	2	0	1	19	4	+15	4	
3	France	3	1	0	2	8	13	−5	2	
4	Norway	3	0	0	3	2	22	−20	0	

Source: IIHF.com
(H) Hosts

11 November 2004; 14:30	Switzerland	8–0 (2–0, 2–0, 4–0)	Norway	Beijing; Attendance: 270

Game reference

Patricia Sautter
Goalies
Christine Smestad
Referee:
Danyel Howard
Linesmen:
Dai Liping
Irina Mogilnikova

Diaz (J. Marty, Cattaneo) – 14:16	1–0
Mosimann (Riechsteiner, Leuenberger) (PP) – 16:22	2–0
Riechsteiner – 33:59	3–0
Meier, (Diaz) – 34:37	4–0
Riechsteiner (Lehmann, S. Marty) – 46:55	5–0
Lehmann (Leuenberger) – 47:10	6–0
Diaz – 54:36	7–0
Diaz – 59:13	8–0

16 min
Penalties
35 min
62
Shots
12

11 November 2004; 18:30	France	1–7 (1–3, 0–3, 0–1)	China	Beijing; Attendance: 500

Game reference

Nolwenn Rousselle
Goalies
Guo Hong
Referee:
Anne Haanpaa
Linesmen:
Kotoe Nashida
Lisa Albers

	0–1	07:47 – Li Xi.
Bidaud (Serre) – 11:42	1–1
	1–2	18:16 – Wang L. (Jin)
	1–3	19:07 – Li Xi. (Guan)
	1–4	21:50 – Sun
	1–5	26:34 – Sun (Qi)
	1–6	37:53 – Jin (Su)
	1–7	55:25 – Su (Sun, Wang L.)

6 min
Penalties
4 min
11
Shots
34

12 November 2004; 14:30	Switzerland	4–3 (0–1, 3–1, 1–1)	France	Beijing; Attendance: 280

Game reference

Patricia Sautter
Goalies
Orane Leenders
Referee:
Mamiko Utsumi
Linesmen:
Liu Chunhua
Lisa albers

	0–1	13:30 – Serre (Duchamp)
Lehmann (Fuhrer) (PP) – 20:20	1–1
S. Marty (Bullo) (PP) – 24:26	2–1
Marty – 25:01	3–1
	3–2	26:11 – Personne (Serre, Iszraelewicz) (PP)
Ruhnke – 45:02	4–2
	4–3	49:20 – Roy

14 min
Penalties
10 min
33
Shots
26

12 November 2004; 18:30	China	10–0 (1–0, 2–0, 7–0)	Norway	Beijing; Attendance: 600

Game reference

Guo Hong
Goalies
Christine Smestad
Referee:
Anne Haanpaa
Linesmen:
Irina Mogilnikova
Kotoe Nashida

Ma X. (Zhang J., Wang L.) (PP) – 08:07	1–0
Zhang B. (Sun) – 31:52	2–0
Sun (Su) – 32:46	3–0
Wang L. (Sun) – 41:41	4–0
Jin (Ma J.) (PP) – 44:14	5–0
Ma X. (Zhang J., Wang L.) (PP) – 44:55	6–0
Jin (Sun) (PP) – 45:32	7–0
Zhang J. (Ma X.) (PP) – 45:54	8–0
Jin (Sun) (PP) – 46:29	9–0
Wang L. (SH) – 55:10	10–0

8 min
Penalties
33 min
41
Shots
14

14 November 2004; 14:30	Norway	2–4 (1–0, 0–4, 1–0)	France	Beijing; Attendance: 300

Game reference

Christine Smestad
Goalies
Nolwenn Rousselle
Referee:
Mamiko Utsumi
Linesmen:
Liu Chunhua
Dai Liping

Carlsson (Ask) – 07:16	1–0
	1–1	25:36 – Iszraelewicz (Duchamp (PP)
	1–2	27:24 – Duchamp
	1–3	38:57 – Roy (Personne)
	1–4	39:35 – Duchamp
Martinsen – 42:52	2–4

8 min
Penalties
6 min
20
Shots
34

14 November 2004; 18:30	China	2–3 (0–0, 0–0, 2–3)	Switzerland	Beijing; Attendance: 890

Game reference

Guo Hong
Goalies
Patricia Sautter
Referee:
Danyel Howard
Linesmen:
Lisa Albers
Irina Mogilnikova

Ma X. (Zhang J.) – 40:48	1–0
	1–1	49:38 – Diaz (Fuhrer)
Zhang B. (Guan) – 52:46	2–1
	2–2	54:17 – Ruhnke (Diaz)
	2–3	59:54 – Riechensteiner (EA)

14 min
Penalties
12 min
25
Shots
25
