= Svetlana Terentieva =

Russian ice hockey forward (born 1983)

- Born: September 25, 1983 (age 41); Pervouralsk, Russian SSR, Soviet Union
- Height: 5 ft 5 in (165 cm)
- Weight: 141 lb (64 kg; 10 st 1 lb)
- Position: Forward
- Shoots: Left
- National team: Russia
- Playing career: 1999–present

Svetlana Terentieva
Medal record

Women's ice hockey

Representing Russia

IIHF World Women's Championships
Bronze medal – third place	2001 Minnesota	Tournament

Svetlana Sergeevna Terentieva (born 25 September 1983 in Yekaterinburg, Russian SSR, Soviet Union) is a Russian ice hockey forward.

== International career ==
Terentieva was selected for the Russia national women's ice hockey team in the 2002 and 2010 Winter Olympics. In both Olympics she recorded one goal in five games. She also played in the qualifying tournament for the 2006 Olympics.

Terentieva has also appeared for Russia at nine IIHF Women's World Championships. Her first appearance came in 1999. She was a part of the bronze medal winning team at the 2001 IIHF Women's World Championship.

== Career statistics ==
=== International career ===
Year	Team	Event	GP	G	A	Pts	PIM
1999	Russia	WW	5	1	1	2	0
2000	Russia	WW	5	2	3	5	0
2001	Russia	WW	5	0	0	0	2
2002	Russia	Oly	5	1	0	1	2
2004	Russia	WW	4	0	1	1	0
2004	Russia	OlyQ	2	0	0	0	0
2005	Russia	WW	5	0	0	0	0
2007	Russia	WW	4	1	3	4	2
2008	Russia	WW	4	1	4	5	2
2009	Russia	WW	4	1	0	1	2
2010	Russia	Oly	5	1	0	1	2
2011	Russia	WW	6	0	1	1	0
