= Tatiana Burina =

Russian ice hockey player (born 1980)

Tatiana Burina Татьяна Бурина
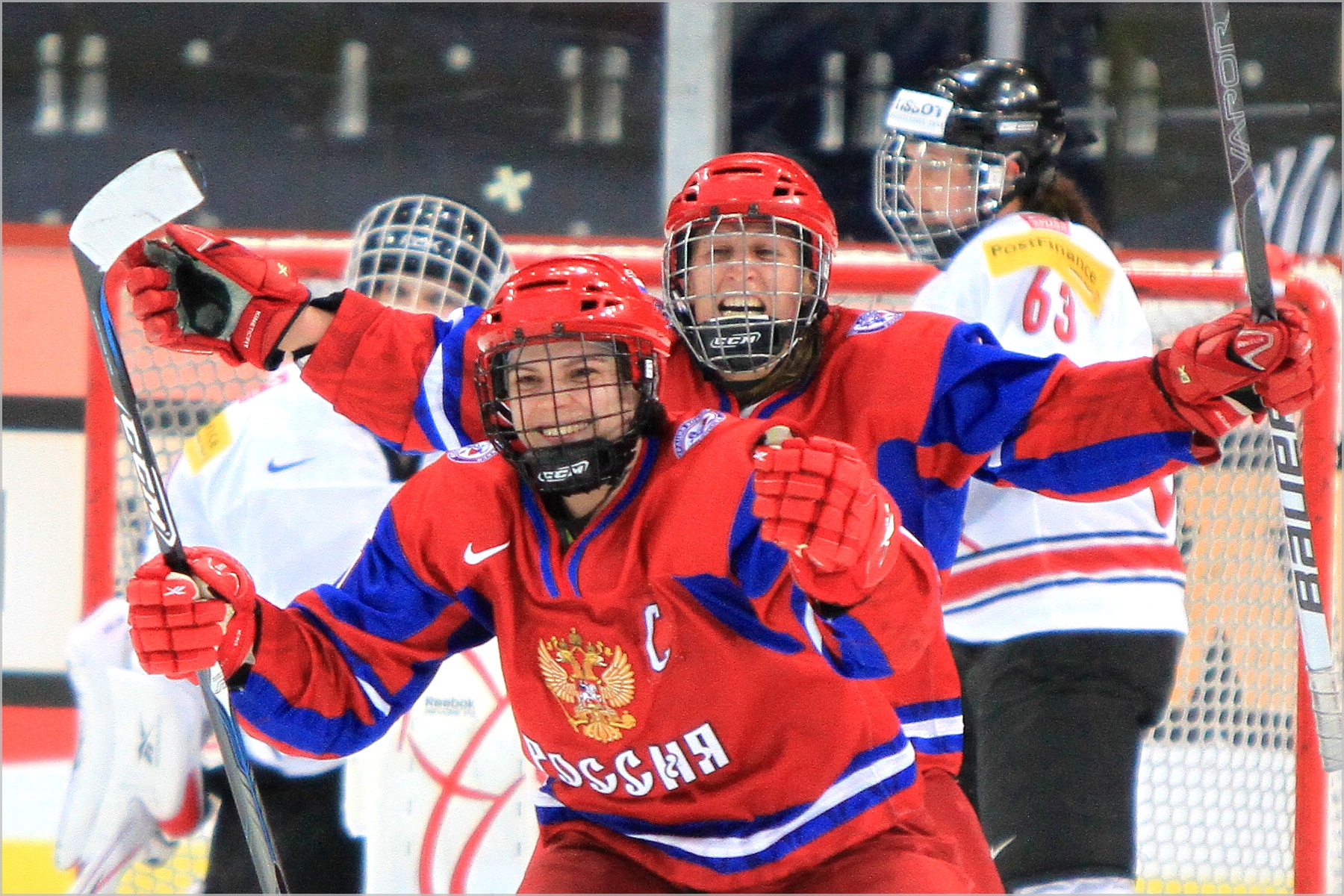
- Burina and teammate at the 2011 World Championship
- Born: 20 March 1980 (age 46) Novosibirsk, Soviet Union
- Height: 163 cm (5 ft 4 in)
- Weight: 73 kg (161 lb; 11 st 7 lb)
- Position: Forward
- Shot: Left
- Played for: Tornado Moscow Region; SKIF Moscow; Lokomotiv Krasnoyarsk
- National team: Russia
- Playing career: 1995–2017
Medal record
World Championship
| Bronze medal – third place | 2001 United States |
| Bronze medal – third place | 2013 Canada |
| Bronze medal – third place | 2016 Canada |

Tatiana Ivanovna Burina (Russian: Татьяна Ивановна Бурина; born 20 March 1980) is a Russian retired ice hockey forward. In December 2017, she was one of eleven Russian athletes who were banned for life from the Olympics by the International Olympic Committee, after doping offences at the 2014 Winter Olympics.

== International career ==
Burina was selected for the Russia national women's ice hockey team in the 2002, 2006 and 2010 Winter Olympics. In 2002, she recorded four goals in five games to lead the team in scoring. In 2006, she had one goal in five games, and in 2010 she had three points in five games. She also played in the qualifying tournament for the 2006 Olympics. Burina has also appeared for Russia at eleven IIHF Women's World Championships. Her first appearance came in 1999. She won bronze medals at the 2001, 2013 and 2016 tournaments.

== Career statistics ==
=== International career ===
| Year | Team | Event | GP | G | A | Pts | PIM |
|---|---|---|---|---|---|---|---|
| 1999 | Russia | WW | 5 | 1 | 0 | 1 | 16 |
| 2000 | Russia | WW | 5 | 0 | 1 | 1 | 2 |
| 2001 | Russia | WW | 5 | 1 | 1 | 2 | 6 |
| 2002 | Russia | Oly | 5 | 4 | 0 | 4 | 0 |
| 2004 | Russia | OlyQ | 2 | 0 | 0 | 0 | 2 |
| 2005 | Russia | WW | 5 | 1 | 0 | 1 | 0 |
| 2006 | Russia | Oly | 5 | 1 | 0 | 1 | 14 |
| 2007 | Russia | WW | 4 | 2 | 0 | 2 | 4 |
| 2008 | Russia | WW | 4 | 0 | 1 | 1 | 2 |
| 2009 | Russia | WW | 4 | 3 | 0 | 3 | 12 |
| 2010 | Russia | Oly | 5 | 1 | 2 | 3 | 4 |
| 2011 | Russia | WW | 6 | 3 | 0 | 3 | 8 |
| 2012 | Russia | WW | 5 | 3 | 1 | 4 | 6 |
| 2013 | Russia | WW | 6 | 2 | 3 | 5 | 0 |
