= Bettina Evers =

German ice hockey forward

- Born: August 17, 1981 (age 43); Hannover, West Germany
- Height: 5 ft 6 in (168 cm)
- Weight: 157 lb (71 kg; 11 st 3 lb)
- Position: Forward
- Shoots: Left
- National team: Germany
- Playing career: 1999–present

Bettina "Tina" Evers (born August 17, 1981 in Hannover, West Germany) is a German ice hockey forward.

== International career ==
Evers was selected for the Germany women's national ice hockey team in the 2002, 2006 and 2014 Winter Olympics. In 2002, she did not have a point. In 2006, she again failed to record a point. In 2014, she had one assist in five games.

Evers also played for Germany in the qualifying event for the 2010 Winter Olympics and the 2006 qualifying.

As of 2014, Evers has also appeared for Germany at eleven IIHF Women's World Championships. Her first appearance came in 1999.

== Career statistics ==
=== International career ===
Through 2013-14 season

Year	Team	Event	GP	G	A	Pts	PIM
1999	Germany	WW	5	1	1	2	2
2000	Germany	WW	5	0	1	1	0
2001	Germany	WW	5	0	2	2	0
2002	Germany	Oly	5	0	0	0	0
2004	Germany	WW	4	0	0	0	4
2004	Germany	OlyQ	3	2	2	4	0
2005	Germany	WW	5	0	0	0	4
2006	Germany	Oly	5	0	0	0	0
2007	Germany	WW	4	1	0	1	2
2008	Germany	WW	4	1	0	1	4
2008	Germany	OlyQ	3	2	1	3	0
2009	Germany	WW DI	5	3	1	4	2
2011	Germany	WW DI	4	1	0	1	0
2012	Germany	WW	5	1	0	1	0
2013	Germany	OlyQ	3	0	0	0	2
2013	Germany	WW	5	0	0	0	0
2014	Germany	Oly	5	1	0	1	2
