= Alyona Khomich =

Russian ice hockey player

Alyona Khomich Алёна Хомич
- Born: 26 February 1981 (age 45) Pervouralsk, Russian SSR, Soviet Union
- Height: 1.68 m (5 ft 6 in)
- Weight: 53 kg (117 lb; 8 st 5 lb)
- Position: Defense
- Shot: Left
- Played for: Agidel Ufa; SKIF Nizhny Novgorod; Spartak-Merkury Yekaterinburg
- Coached for: Spartak-Merkury Yekaterinburg
- National team: Russia
- Playing career: 1999–2016
- Coaching career: 2011–2013
Medal record
World Championship
Bronze medal – third place	2001 Minnesota

Alyona Andreyevna Khomich (Russian: Алёна Андреевна Хомич; born 26 February 1981), also known as Alena Khomich (from the mis-romanization of her given name), is a Russian retired ice hockey defenseman and former member of the Russian national ice hockey team. A four-time Olympian, she represented Russia at the Winter Olympic Games in 2002, 2006, 2010, and 2014.

== International career ==
At the Winter Olympics in both 2010 and 2006, she scored one assist in five games. In 2002, she did not record a point in five games. She also played in the qualifying tournament for the 2006 Olympics, scoring one point in the two games.

Khomich has also appeared for Russia at nine IIHF Women's World Championships. Her first appearance came in 1999. She was a member of the team that won a bronze medal at the 2001 IIHF Women's World Championship.

== Career statistics ==
=== International career ===
Year	Team	Event	GP	G	A	Pts	PIM
1999	Russia	WW	5	0	0	0	6
2000	Russia	WW	5	0	1	1	6
2001	Russia	WW	5	0	0	0	2
2002	Russia	Oly	5	0	0	0	0
2004	Russia	WW	4	0	0	0	6
2004	Russia	OlyQ	2	0	1	1	0
2005	Russia	WW	5	0	0	0	6
2006	Russia	Oly	5	0	1	1	4
2007	Russia	WW	4	0	1	1	2
2008	Russia	WW	4	0	1	1	2
2009	Russia	WW	4	0	1	1	2
2010	Russia	Oly	5	0	1	1	0
2011	Russia	WW	6	0	1	1	8
