= Tatiana Sotnikova =

Russian ice hockey forward (born 1981)

- Born: January 20, 1981 (age 45) Moscow, Russian SFSR, Soviet Union
- Height: 5 ft 5 in (165 cm)
- Weight: 134 lb (61 kg; 9 st 8 lb)
- Position: Forward
- Shot: Left
- National team: Russia
- Playing career: 1999–2010

Tatiana Sotnikova
Medal record

Women's ice hockey

Representing Russia

IIHF World Women's Championships
Bronze medal – third place	2001 Minnesota	Tournament

Tatiana Yurievna Sotnikova (born 20 January 1981 in Moscow, Russian SFSR, Soviet Union) is a Russian ice hockey forward.

== International career ==
Sotnikova was selected for the Russia national women's ice hockey team in the 2002, 2006 and 2010 Winter Olympics. In 2002, she did not score a point in five games. In 2006, she had one assist in five games, and in 2010 she had one goal in five games. She also played in the qualifying tournament for the 2006 Olympics.

Sotnikova has also appeared for Russia at six IIHF Women's World Championships. Her first appearance came in 1999. She was a part of the bronze medal winning team at the 2001 IIHF Women's World Championship.

== Career statistics ==
=== International career ===
Year	Team	Event	GP	G	A	Pts	PIM
1999	Russia	WW	5	0	0	0	0
2000	Russia	WW	5	0	0	0	2
2001	Russia	WW	5	0	0	0	4
2002	Russia	Oly	5	0	0	0	0
2004	Slovakia	OlyQ	2	0	1	1	6
2004	Russia	WW	4	2	1	3	0
2005	Russia	WW	5	1	0	1	2
2006	Russia	Oly	5	0	1	1	4
2009	Russia	WW	4	0	2	2	0
2010	Russia	Oly	5	1	0	1	2
