= Lisa Schuster =

German ice hockey player (born 1987)

- Born: 28 May 1987 (age 39) West Berlin, West Germany
- Height: 5 ft 7 in (170 cm)
- Weight: 155 lb (70 kg; 11 st 1 lb)
- Position: Forward
- Shoots: Left
- DFEL team: OSC Berlin
- National team: Germany
- Playing career: 2008–present

Lisa Christine Schuster (born 28 May 1987) is a German ice hockey player for OSC Berlin and the German national team. She participated at the 2015 IIHF Women's World Championship.

== International career ==
Schuster was selected for the Germany women's national ice hockey team in the 2014 Winter Olympics. She recorded one assist.

Schuster also played for Germany in the qualifying event for the 2014 Winter Olympics, and the 2010 Olympics

As of 2014, Schuster has also appeared for Germany at four IIHF Women's World Championships. Her first appearance came in 2008.

== Career statistics ==
Through 2013–14 season

| Year | Team | Event | GP | G | A | Pts | PIM |
|---|---|---|---|---|---|---|---|
| 2008 | Germany | WW | 4 | 0 | 0 | 0 | 2 |
| 2008 | Germany | OlyQ | 3 | 1 | 0 | 1 | 0 |
| 2009 | Germany | WW DI | 5 | 1 | 0 | 1 | 6 |
| 2012 | Germany | WW | 5 | 1 | 0 | 1 | 2 |
| 2013 | Germany | OlyQ | 3 | 0 | 1 | 1 | 0 |
| 2013 | Germany | WW | 5 | 2 | 0 | 2 | 0 |
| 2014 | Germany | Oly | 5 | 0 | 1 | 1 | 0 |
