= 1999 World Ice Hockey Championships =

1999 World Ice Hockey Championships may refer to:

- 1999 Men's World Ice Hockey Championships
- 1999 IIHF Women's World Championship
