= Maritta Becker =

German ice hockey player and coach (born 1981)

- Born: 11 March 1981 (age 45) Heilbronn, West Germany
- Height: 5 ft 6 in (168 cm)
- Weight: 141 lb (64 kg; 10 st 1 lb)
- Position: Forward
- Shoots: L
- National team: Germany
- Playing career: 1999–present

Maritta Becker (born 11 March 1981 in Heilbronn, West Germany) is a German ice hockey forward and coach.

== International career ==
Becker was selected for the Germany women's national ice hockey team in the 2002, 2006 and 2014 Winter Olympics. In 2002, she led the team in scoring, with three goals and two assists. In 2006, she again led the team, with the same point totals. In 2014, she had one assist in five games.

Becker also played for Germany in the qualifying event for the 2010 Winter Olympics and the 2006 qualifying.

As of 2014, Becker has also appeared for Germany at eight IIHF Women's World Championships. Her first appearance came in 1999.

Becker has also served as an assistant coach of the women's national team, at the 2012, and as a head coach of the Germany women's national under-18 ice hockey team, at the IIHF World Women's U18 Championships in 2012 and 2013

== Career statistics ==
=== International career ===
Through 2013-14 season

Year	Team	Event	GP	G	A	Pts	PIM
1999	Germany	WW	5	1	0	1	6
2000	Germany	WW	5	1	1	2	6
2001	Germany	WW	5	1	2	3	4
2002	Germany	Oly	5	3	2	5	8
2004	Germany	WW	4	2	1	3	6
2004	Germany	OlyQ	3	4	4	8	4
2005	Germany	WW	5	0	3	3	2
2006	Germany	Oly	5	3	2	5	8
2007	Germany	WW	4	0	1	1	6
2009	Germany	OlyQ	3	0	1	1	2
2009	Germany	WW DI	4	3	6	9	6
2013	Germany	OlyQ	3	0	0	0	2
2013	Germany	WW	5	1	1	2	4
2014	Germany	Oly	5	0	1	1	2
