= Susanne Fellner =

German ice hockey defender

- Born: 26 February 1985 (age 40); Ravensburg, West Germany
- Height: 5 ft 3 in (160 cm)
- Weight: 126 lb (57 kg; 9 st 0 lb)
- Position: Defense
- Shoots: L
- National team: Germany
- Playing career: 2005–present

Susanne Fellner (born 26 February 1985 in Ravensburg, West Germany) is a German ice hockey defender. Fellner also played for the University of North Dakota Women's Hockey team for the 2008-09 season.

== International career ==
Fellner was selected for the Germany women's national ice hockey team in the 2006 and 2014 Winter Olympics. In 2006, she did not record a point in five games. In 2014, she again did not score in the five games.

Fellner also played for Germany in the qualifying event for the 2014 Winter Olympics, the 2010 Olympics and the 2006 Olympics.

As of 2014, Fellner has also appeared for Germany at six IIHF Women's World Championships. Her first appearance came in 2005.

== Career statistics ==
=== International career ===
Through 2013-14 season

Year	Team	Event	GP	G	A	Pts	PIM
2004	Germany	OlyQ	3	0	1	1	0
2005	Germany	WW	5	1	0	1	0
2006	Germany	Oly	5	0	0	0	0
2007	Germany	WW	4	0	1	1	4
2008	Germany	WW	4	0	1	1	2
2008	Germany	OlyQ	3	0	0	0	0
2011	Germany	WW DI	4	0	0	0	0
2012	Germany	WW	5	0	2	2	2
2013	Germany	OlyQ	3	0	2	2	0
2013	Germany	WW	5	0	2	2	0
2014	Germany	Oly	5	0	0	0	0
