= Benjamin Hinterstocker =

German ice hockey coach (born 1979)

- Born: November 26, 1979 (age 45); Berlin, Germany
- Height: 6 ft 0 in (183 cm)
- Weight: 203 lb (92 kg; 14 st 7 lb)
- Position: Forward
- Played for: SC Riessersee; HC TWK Innsbruck; ESC Dorfen; Kassel Huskies; Eisbären Berlin; Kölner Haie; Füchse Duisburg; SC Bietigheim-Bissingen; Essen Mosquitoes; Hamburg Freezers
- National team: Germany
- Playing career: 1996–2007

Benjamin Hinterstocker (born November 26, 1979) is a German ice hockey coach.

He coached the German national team at the 2015 IIHF Women's World Championship.
