= Marie-Kristin Schmid =

German ice hockey player (born 1996)

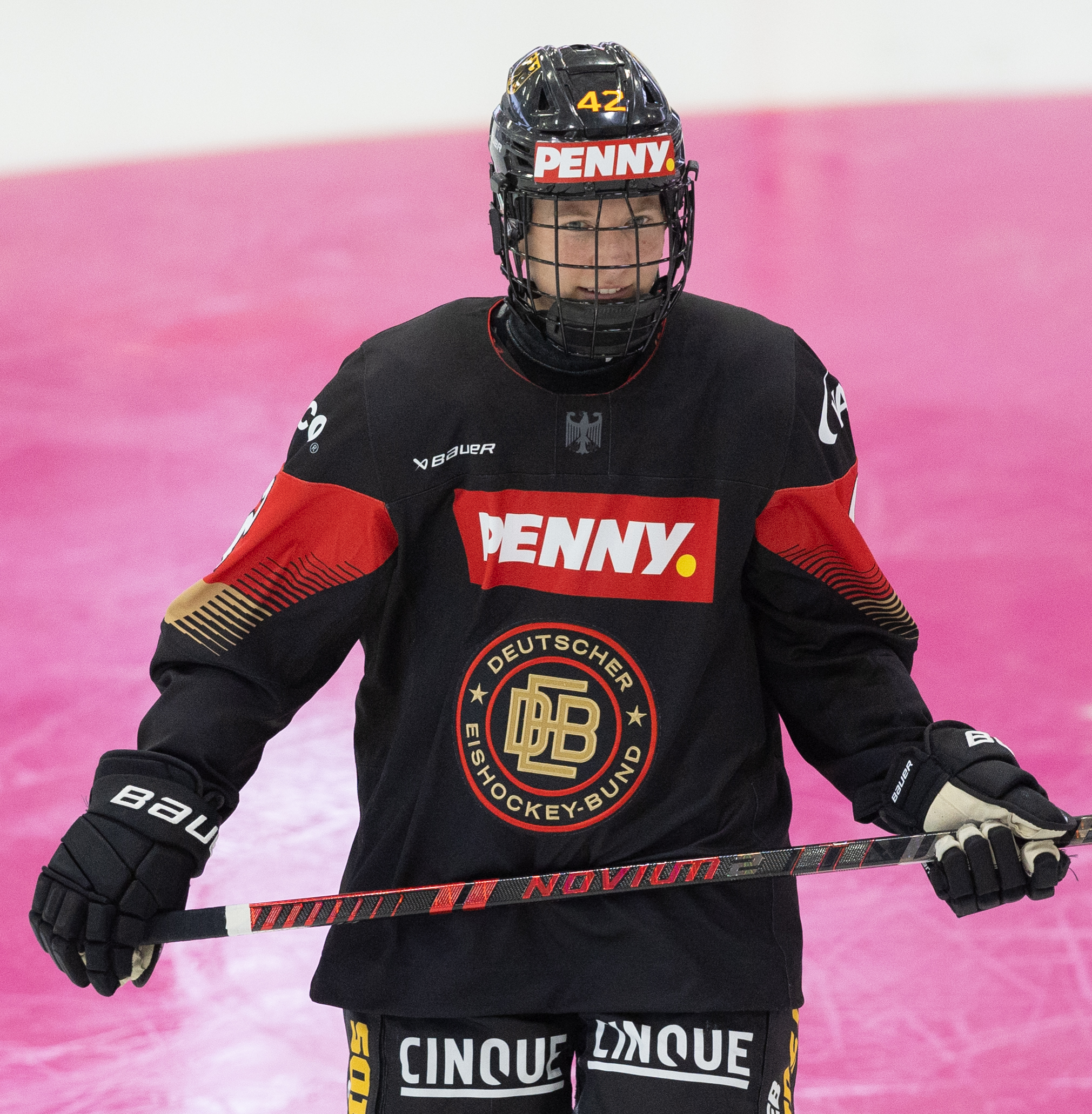
- Born: 15 December 1996 (age 29) Garmisch-Partenkirchen, Germany
- Height: 1.65 m (5 ft 5 in)
- Weight: 60 kg (132 lb; 9 st 6 lb)
- Position: Forward
- Shoots: Left
- DFEL team Former teams: ERC Ingolstadt; SC Garmisch-Partenkirchen
- National team: Germany
- Playing career: 2011–present

Marie-Kristin Schmid (born 15 December 1996) is a German ice hockey player for ERC Ingolstadt and the German national team.

She represented Germany at the 2019 IIHF Women's World Championship.
