= Nadezhda Alexandrova =

Russian ice hockey player (born 1986)

- Born: 3 January 1986 (age 40) Moscow, Soviet Union
- Height: 172 cm (5 ft 8 in)
- Weight: 63 kg (139 lb; 9 st 13 lb)
- Position: Goaltender
- Catches: Left
- ZhHL team Former teams: Tornado Moscow Region; SKIF Nizhny Novgorod
- National team: Russia
- Playing career: 2006–present
Medal record
World Championship
Bronze medal – third place	2013 Canada

Nadezhda Valeriyevna Alexandrova (Russian: Надежда Валерьевна Александрова; born 3 January 1986) is a Russian ice hockey goaltender, who most recently played with Tornado Moscow Region of the Women's Hockey League (ZhHL) in the 2018–19 season. As a member of the Russian national team, she won bronze at the 2013 IIHF Women's World Championship and competed at the 2017 IIHF World Women's Championship. She played with the Olympic Athletes from Russia (OAR) in the women's ice hockey tournament at the 2018 Winter Olympics.

== Career statistics ==
=== International ===
Year	Team	Event	Result	GP	W	L	T/OT	MIN	GA	SO	GAA	SV%
2006	Russia	OG	6th	1	0	0	0	43:35	7	0	9.64	0.741
2018	Russia	OG	4th	2	0	0	0	26:46	1	0	2.24	0.962
