= Celeste Bissardella =

Italian ice hockey player

Personal information
- Nationality: Italian
- Born: 17 October 1988 (age 36); Bolzano, Italy

Sport
- Sport: Ice hockey

Celeste Bissardella (born 17 October 1988) is an Italian ice hockey player. She competed in the women's tournament at the 2006 Winter Olympics.
