= Katharina Sparer =

Italian ice hockey player

Personal information
- Nationality: Italian
- Born: 22 February 1990 (age 35); Bolzano, Italy

Sport
- Sport: Ice hockey

Katharina Sparer (born 22 February 1990) is an Italian ice hockey player. She competed in the women's tournament at the 2006 Winter Olympics.
