= 2013 IIHF Women's World Championship =

Tournament details
- Host country: Canada
- Venues: 2 (in 1 host city)
- Dates: April 2–9, 2013
- Opened by: David Johnston
- Teams: 8

Final positions
- Champions: United States (5th title)
- Runners-up: Canada
- Third place: Russia
- Fourth place: Finland

Tournament statistics
- Games played: 21
- Goals scored: 109 (5.19 per game)
- Attendance: 97,156 (4,626 per game)
- Scoring leader(s): (Canada) Marie-Philip Poulin (12 points)

Awards
- MVP: (Canada) Marie-Philip Poulin

The 2013 IIHF Women's World Championship was the 15th edition of the Top Division of the Women's Ice Hockey World Championship (the 16th edition overall, if the season when only the lower divisions were played is also counted), organized by the International Ice Hockey Federation (IIHF).

The Top Division tournament was hosted in Ottawa, Ontario, Canada, and was primarily played in small community arenas, including the Nepean Sportsplex, but most games were held at Scotiabank Place. The matches were played from April 2 to 9, 2013.

The United States won their fifth world title, after with a 3–2 win over the Canada, while Russia defeated Finland, 2–0, to win its second bronze medal in tournament history.

The tournament was held at Ottawa, Ontario, Canada, the site of the first Women's World Championship in 1990. Organizers set a tournament record of over 150,000 tickets sold, and a preliminary round contest between Canada and Finland set an all-time attendance mark for a women's hockey game of 18,013. Canada's Marie-Philip Poulin was named top forward and most valuable player after leading the tournament with 12 points. Finland's Jenni Hiirikoski was named top defenceman and Russia's Nadezhda Alexandrova was named top goaltender.

== Top Division ==
The Top Division of the world championship was contested between eight teams from April 2 to April 9, 2013, in Ottawa, Ontario, Canada. It was the second time the tournament was held in Canada's capital city as Ottawa hosted the inaugural Women's World Championship in 1990. The women's game had undergone a considerable period of growth in the intervening 23 years; the 1990 tournament was primarily played in small community arenas, but the majority of the 2013 event was held in the 19,153-seat Scotiabank Place arena.

The host city set a tournament record by selling over 150,000 tickets for the tournament, but gate attendance fell short of the record of 119,231 set in 2007. Such discrepancies are not unusual at IIHF events, where games are often sold in packages in order to boost attendance figures of less attractive fixtures. However, both actual attendance and ticket sales were below the ambitious pre-tournament objective of 200,000 spectators relayed to the media by the organizers.

According to Hockey Canada, the announced crowd of 18,013 for the preliminary round game between Canada and Finland set an all-time record for a women's hockey game. A large component of the crowd was made up of female players competing in the Ontario Women's Hockey Association provincial championships, which was scheduled to coincide with the Women's World Championship. The game surpassed the previous record of 16,347, also set in Ottawa, for a pre-Olympic exhibition game in 2010. The record was finally beaten on February 16, 2024, by a Professional Women's Hockey League match between Montréal and Toronto which amassed a crowd of 19,285.

Overnight data indicates that an average 795,000 viewers watched the gold medal game in Canada, making it the highest rated Women's World Championship final in TSN's history.

=== Teams ===
The preliminary round was divided into two pools and introduced a new format that placed the top four seeds into Group A, and the bottom four in Group B. The top two finishers in Group A advanced directly to the semifinals, while the two remaining teams and the top two in Group B played a quarterfinal round. The change in format helped reduce the number of severely one-sided contests in a tournament praised by IIHF president René Fasel for its increasing competitiveness.

Each team's roster for the 2013 IIHF Women's World Championship consisted of at least 15 skaters (forwards, and defencemen) and 2 goaltenders, and at most 20 skaters and 3 goaltenders. All eight participating nations, through the confirmation of their respective national associations, had to submit a roster by the first IIHF directorate.

Group A

- Canada
- United States
- Switzerland
- Finland

Group B

- Sweden
- Russia
- Germany
- Czech Republic — promoted to Top Division pool for 2013

=== Officials ===
The IIHF selected six referees and nine linesmen to work the 2013 IIHF Women's World Championship. They were the following:

Referees

- (Canada) Melanie Bordeleau
- (France) Marie Picavet
- (Germany) Nicole Hertrich
- (United Kingdom) Joy Tottman
- (Norway) Aina Hove
- (United States) Kristine Langley

Linesmen

- (Canada) Denise Caughey
- (Canada) Stephanie Gagnon
- (Czech Republic) Ilona Novotná
- (Czech Republic) Zuzana Svobodová
- (Finland) Johanna Tauriainen

Linesmen

- (Slovakia) Michaela Kúdelová
- (Sweden) Therese Bjorkman
- (United States) Kate Connolly
- (United States) Laura Johnson

=== Tournament highlights ===
The opening night featured a match-up of the game's top powers, Canada and the United States. The contest ended with a 3–2 Canadian win, decided by a shootout, in what was viewed as a preview of the probable gold medal final. The Canadian team made headlines by wearing yellow and black uniforms in lieu of the team's usual red and white colors. This was part of a promotion for the Nike-backed Livestrong cancer awareness initiative, whose founder Lance Armstrong had confessed to doping a few months earlier. Nike hoped to attach the Livestrong brand to other athletes, and the jerseys were subsequently auctioned in support of the charity. Both teams easily won their remaining pool games, to earn byes to the semifinals.

After failing to win a game in the 2012 tournament, Russia rebounded in 2013 by winning all of its pool games to lead Group B. It clinched first place with a 4–0 victory over Sweden, a nation that entered the tournament with high medal hopes but was instead forced to play a best-of-three series against the Czech Republic to avoid relegation. The Swedes, who hosted the next tournament in 2015, retained their position in the top division by winning the series against the Czechs by 2–1 (SO) and 4–0 scores. The Czech Republic, who were promoted from Division 1A for this tournament, were relegated back to the lower division.

In the medal round, Germany joined Russia in reaching the quarterfinal round from Group B, while Finland and Switzerland qualified out of Group A. The Russians won their fourth consecutive game in the tournament by defeating the 2012 bronze medal-winning Switzerland team 2–1 to earn a semifinal game against Canada. Forty-year-old Yekaterina Pashkevich, the eldest player in the tournament, said that her nation's turnaround following a winless 2012 tournament could be attributed to increased "drive and motivation" in the country as a result of Russia hosting the 2014 Winter Olympics. In the second semifinal, Finland beat Germany 1–0 to earn a match-up with the United States. Goaltender Meeri Raisanen recorded the shutout after unexpectedly being named her team's starter in favour of Finland's number-one goaltender, Noora Raty.

Russia's unbeaten run came to an end in the semifinals as they were routed by Canada, 8–1. In a closer contest, the United States defeated Finland, 3–0. The results set up the 15th consecutive gold medal match-up between the two North American rivals.

In the bronze medal game, the Russians captured only their second medal in tournament history with a 2–0 victory over Finland. They earned the win on the goaltending of Nadezhda Alexandrova, who stopped all 32 shots she faced for the shutout.

The United States defeated Canada, 3–2 to win its fifth world championship in seven years. The winning goal was scored by Amanda Kessel for the American team that outshot their opponents 30–16. The goaltending of Shannon Szabados was credited with keeping Canada close as Americans used their speed advantage to overcome Canada's size and physical presence.

=== Preliminary round ===
==== Group A ====
Pos	Team	Pld	W	OTW	OTL	L	GF	GA	GD	Pts	Qualification
1	Canada	3	2	1	0	0	24	2	+22	8	Semifinals
2	United States	3	2	0	1	0	11	5	+6	7	Semifinals
3	Finland	3	1	0	0	2	4	13	−9	3	Quarterfinals
4	Switzerland	3	0	0	0	3	1	20	−19	0	Quarterfinals

Source: IIHF

All times are local (Eastern Time Zone – UTC−4).

2 April 2013; 15:30	Finland	2–1 (0–1, 2–0, 0–0)	Switzerland	Scotiabank Place, Ottawa; Attendance: 3,366

Game reference

Noora Räty
Goalies
Florence Schelling
Referee:
(Canada) Melanie Bordeleau
Linesmen:
(United States) Kate Connolly
(Slovakia) Michaela Kúdelová

	0–1	04:37 – K. Nabholz (S. Marty, J. Marty)
A. Rajahuhta (L. Välimäki, M. Karvinen) (PP) – 26:54	1–1
M. Karvinen – 29:24	2–1

8 min
Penalties
16 min
44
Shots
17

2 April 2013; 19:30	Canada	3–2 GWS (0–2, 0–0, 2–0) (OT: 0–0) (SO: 1–0)	United States	Scotiabank Place, Ottawa; Attendance: 11,174

Game reference

Shannon Szabados
Goalies
Jessica Vetter
Referee:
(United Kingdom) Joy Tottman
Linesmen:
(Czech Republic) Zuzana Svobodová
(Finland) Johanna Tauriainen

	0–1	04:05 – M. Lamoureux-Kolls (J. Lamoureux, G. Marvin) (PP)
	0–2	18:54 – B. Decker (A. Kessel, A. Carpenter)
R. Johnston (S. Vaillancourt, J. Wakefield) – 51:13	1–2
C. Ward (H. Irwin, S. Vaillancourt) – 58:13	2–2

J. Hefford (miss)
M. Agosta-Marciano
S. Vaillancourt (miss)
J. Wakefield
Shootout
H. Knight
(miss) M. Lamoureux-Kolls
(miss) B. Decker
(miss) H. Knight
10 min
Penalties
12 min
27
Shots
29

3 April 2013; 15:30	United States	4–2 (4–1, 0–1, 0–0)	Finland	Scotiabank Place, Ottawa; Attendance: 3,113

Game reference

Brianne McLaughlin
Goalies
Noora Räty
Referee:
(Norway) Aina Hove
Linesmen:
(Czech Republic) Ilona Novotná
(Czech Republic) Zuzana Svobodová

M. Lamoureux-Kolls (J. Lamoureux, L. Chesson) – 05:06	1–0
B. Decker (G. Marvin, A. Kessel) – 10:35	2–0
	2–1	12:39 – R. Lindstedt (K. Rantamäki, N. Tikkinen)
A. Kessel (B. Decker, M. Bozek) – (PP) 17:26	3–1
M. Lamoureux-Kolls (J. Lamoureux, K. Coyne) – 18:47	4–1
	4–2	21:11 – M. Karvinen (L. Välimäki, M. Jalosuo)

6 min
Penalties
6 min
42
Shots
13

3 April 2013; 19:30	Switzerland	0–13 (0–2, 0–6, 0–5)	Canada	Scotiabank Place, Ottawa; Attendance: 9,904

Game reference

Sophie Anthamatten
Dominique Slongo
Goalies
Charline Labonté
Referee:
(United States) Kristine Langley
Linesmen:
(Sweden) Therese Bjorkman
(Slovakia) Michaela Kúdelová

0–1	04:40 – J. Wakefield
0–2	12:48 – M-P. Poulin (L. Fortino)
0–3	23:49 – R. Johnston (C. Ward, J. Wakefield) (PP)
0–4	25:30 – J. Hefford (M-P. Poulin, J. Larocque) (SH)
0–5	28:11 – N. Spooner (R. Johnston, J. Larocque)
0–6	33:32 – B. Jenner
0–7	37:46 – S. Vaillancourt (H. Irwin, L. Rougeau)
0–8	39:58 – B. Jenner (J. Wakefield, M. Mikkelson Reid)
0–9	46:23 – H. Irwin (M. Agosta-Marciano) (PP)
0–10	47:37 – M-P. Poulin (J. Hefford)
0–11	50:44 – Marie-Philip Poulin (J. Hefford)
0–12	55:42 – M. Mikkelson Reid (B. Bram, G. Apps)
0–13	56:45 – M-P. Poulin (T. Bonhomme, B. Jenner)

8 min
Penalties
18 min
16
Shots
79

5 April 2013; 15:30	United States	5–0 (2–0, 1–0, 2–0)	Switzerland	Scotiabank Place, Ottawa; Attendance: 5,626

Game reference

Jessie Vetter
Goalies
Florence Schelling
Referee:
(France) Marie Picavet
Linesmen:
(Sweden) Therese Bjorkman
(Czech Republic) Ilona Novotná

A. Carpenter (J. Lamoureux, H. Knight) (PP) – 19:20	1–0
B. Decker (L. Stecklein, A. Kessel) – 19:31	2–0
B. Decker (A. Kessel, K. Coyne) – 28:08	3–0
K. Coyne (A. Kessel, B. Decker) – 41:23	4–0
J. Chu (K. Bellamy, M. Bozek) – 43:03	5–0

10 min
Penalties
10 min
61
Shots
6

5 April 2013; 19:30	Canada	8–0 (3–0, 1–0, 4–0)	Finland	Scotiabank Place, Ottawa; Attendance: 18,014

Game reference

Shannon Szabados
Goalies
Noora Räty
Meeri Räisänen
Referee:
(Germany) Nicole Hertrich
Linesmen:
(United States) Laura Johnson
(Slovakia) Michaela Kúdelová

B. Bram (C. Ouellette, C. Ward) – 14:25	1–0
B. Jenner (C. Birchard, M-P. Poulin) – 16:03	2–0
B. Jenner (J. Hefford, M-P. Poulin) (EA) – 18:06	3–0
M. Agosta-Marciano (H. Irwin, S. Vaillancourt) – 39:00	4–0
M. Agosta-Marciano (H. Irwin, C. Ward) – 41:38	5–0
S. Vaillancourt (M. Agosta-Marciano, T. Bonhomme) – 44:26	6–0
J. Wakefield (R. Johnston) – 45:47	7–0
M. Agosta-Marciano (S. Vaillancourt, C. Birchard) – 46:52	8–0

14 min
Penalties
8 min
43
Shots
16

==== Group B ====
Pos	Team	Pld	W	OTW	OTL	L	GF	GA	GD	Pts	Qualification
1	Russia	3	3	0	0	0	11	1	+10	9	Quarterfinals
2	Germany	3	1	0	1	1	8	10	−2	4	Quarterfinals
3	Czech Republic	3	1	0	0	2	7	11	−4	3	Relegation round
4	Sweden	3	0	1	0	2	5	9	−4	2	Relegation round

Source: IIHF

All times are local (Eastern Time Zone – UTC−04:00).

2 April 2013; 12:00	Russia	4–0 (1–0, 0–0, 3–0)	Germany	Nepean Sportsplex, Ottawa; Attendance: 409

Game reference

Nadezhda Alexandrova
Goalies
Viona Harrer
Referee:
(United States) Kristine Langley
Linesmen:
(Sweden) Therese Bjorkman
(Canada) Denise Caughey

Y. Solovyova (I. Gavrilova, Y. Smolentseva) – 14:42	1–0
L. Belyakova (A. Vafina, A. Shibanova) – 52:18	2–0
Y. Smolentseva (A. Shibanova, Y. Smolina) (PP) – 54:23	3–0
S. Tkachyova (V. Pavlova, I. Dyubanok) – 59:25	4–0

2 min
Penalties
8 min
38
Shots
14

2 April 2013; 16:00	Sweden	2–3 (0–2, 2–1, 0–0)	Czech Republic	Nepean Sportsplex, Ottawa; Attendance: 186

Game reference

Valentina Lizana
Goalies
Radka Lhotská
Referee:
(Norway) Aina Hove
Linesmen:
(Canada) Stephanie Gagnon
(United States) Laura Johnson

	0–1	08:24 – L. Povová (D. Vopravilová) (PP)
	0–2	14:02 – K. Chmelová (P. Herzigová) (PP)
E. Grahm (E. Eliasson) – 27:48	1–2
E. Holmlöv (J. Asserholt) – 28:37	2–2
	2–3	37:09 – E. Holešová (A. Lédlová, T. Vanišová)

10 min
Penalties
8 min
19
Shots
26

3 April 2013; 12:00	Russia	3–1 (1–0, 1–1, 1–0)	Czech Republic	Nepean Sportsplex, Ottawa; Attendance: 1,045

Game reference

Anna Prugova
Goalies
Radka Lhotská
Referee:
(Germany) Nicole Hertrich
Linesmen:
(United States) Kate Connolly
(United States) Laura Johnson

Y. Lebedeva (T. Burina) – 03:22	1–0
A. Vafina (Y. Smolentseva, I. Gavrilova) – 33:37	2–0
	2–1	36:51 – D. Křížová (A. Polenska, K. Mrázová)
T. Burina (Y. Lebedeva) (SH) – 54:38	3–1

6 min
Penalties
12 min
19
Shots
20

3 April 2013; 16:00	Germany	2–3 OT (2–1, 0–0, 0–1) (OT 0–1)	Sweden	Nepean Sportsplex, Ottawa; Attendance: 291

Game reference

Jennifer Harß
Goalies
Sara Grahn
Referee:
(France) Marie Picavet
Linesmen:
(Canada) Denise Caughey
(Canada) Stephanie Gagnon

S. Götz (S. Seiler) (PP) – 13:04	1–0
S. Seiler (M. Becker) – 14:59	2–0
	2–1	17:40 – L. Johansson (L. Wester)
	2–2	49:54 – L. Johansson (A. Borgqvist)
	2–3	60:53 – P. Winberg

8 min
Penalties
6 min
11
Shots
33

5 April 2013; 12:00	Czech Republic	3–6 (1–1, 0–3, 2–2)	Germany	Nepean Sportsplex, Ottawa; Attendance: 1,234

Game reference

Radka Lhotská
Kateřina Bečevová
Goalies
Viona Harrer
Referee:
(Canada) Melanie Bordeleau
Linesmen:
(Canada) Stephanie Gagnon
(Finland) Johanna Tauriainen

	0–1	09:27 – J. Zorn (F. Busch, M. Anwander)
K. Chmelová (K. Mrázová) – 14:11	1–1
	1–2	21:13 – A. Lanzl (K. Spielberger) (PP)
	1–3	29:04 – F. Busch (J. Zorn, M. Anwander) (PP)
	1–4	30:29 – M. Becker (K. Spielberger)
	1–5	46:51 – F. Busch (S. Fellner)
	1–6	49:44 – L. Schuster (N. Kamenik, S. Kratzer)
L. Manhartová (K. Chmelová, A. Lédlová) – 54:29	2–6
D. Lásková (K. Chmelová, J. Fialová) – 55:41	3–6

16 min
Penalties
10 min
30
Shots
23

5 April 2013; 16:00	Sweden	0–4 (0–1, 0–2, 0–1)	Russia	Nepean Sportsplex, Ottawa; Attendance: 635

Game reference

Valentina Lizana
Sara Grahn
Goalies
Nadezhda Alexandrova
Anna Prugova
Referee:
(United Kingdom) Joy Tottman
Linesmen:
(United States) Kate Connolly
(Czech Republic) Zuzana Svobodová

0–1	06:41 – Y. Smolentseva (I. Gavrilova, A. Shibanova) (PP)
0–2	23:55 – G. Skiba (Y. Lebedeva)
0–3	30:59 – A. Vafina (A. Kapustina, A. Shibanova) (PP)
0–4	59:44 – Y. Dergachyova (A. Kapustina) (ENG)

14 min
Penalties
8 min
17
Shots
36

=== Relegation round ===
Best of three.

All times are local (Eastern Time Zone – UTC−4).

6 April 2013; 16:00	Czech Republic	1–2 GWS (0–1, 0–0, 1–0) (OT 0–0) (SO: 0–1)	Sweden	Nepean Sportsplex, Ottawa; Attendance: 667

Game reference
Radka Lhotská	Goalies	Sara Grahn	Referee: (Norway) Aina Hove; Linesmen: (Slovakia) Michaela Kúdelová (Finland) Johanna Tauriainen
/ 0–1 / 11:12 – L. Johansson (L. Wester, E. Eliasson); A. Polenska (L. Povová, D. Křížová) – 50:42 / 1–1			Referee: (Norway) Aina Hove; Linesmen: (Slovakia) Michaela Kúdelová (Finland) Johanna Tauriainen
P. Herzigová (miss); K. Mrázová (miss); V. Přibylová (miss)	Shootout	(miss) E. Holmlöv; (miss) P. Winberg; E. Eliasson	Referee: (Norway) Aina Hove; Linesmen: (Slovakia) Michaela Kúdelová (Finland) Johanna Tauriainen
12 min	Penalties	18 min	Referee: (Norway) Aina Hove; Linesmen: (Slovakia) Michaela Kúdelová (Finland) Johanna Tauriainen
25	Shots	36	Referee: (Norway) Aina Hove; Linesmen: (Slovakia) Michaela Kúdelová (Finland) Johanna Tauriainen

8 April 2013; 12:00	Sweden	4–0 (0–0, 2–0, 2–0)	Czech Republic	Nepean Sportsplex, Ottawa; Attendance: 604

Game reference

Sara Grahn
Goalies
Radka Lhotská
Referee:
(Canada) Melanie Bordeleau
Linesmen:
(United States) Kate Connolly
(United States) Laura Johnson

L. Hedengren (O. Carlsson, P. Winberg) – 21:45	1–0
L. Wester (A. Borgqvist) – 29:56	2–0
J. Olofsson (A. Borgqvist) – 48:34	3–0
E. Holmlöv (P. Winberg) (PP) – 59:35	4–0

10 min
Penalties
12 min
21
Shots
19

- The third game of the relegation series was cancelled because Sweden won both meetings and the Czech Republic is therefore relegated to the 2014 Division I A.

=== Final round ===
Quarterfinals
A4	Switzerland	1
B1	Russia	2
A3	Finland	1
B2	Germany	0

Semifinals
A1	Canada	8
B1	Russia	1
A2	United States	3
A3	Finland	0

Final
A1	Canada	2
A2	United States	3
Bronze medal game
B1	Russia	2
A3	Finland	0

==== Quarterfinals ====
6 April 2013; 15:30	Finland	1–0 (1–0, 0–0, 0–0)	Germany	Scotiabank Place, Ottawa; Attendance: 5,406

Game reference
Meeri Räisänen	Goalies	Jennifer Harß	Referee: (United States) Kristine Langley; Linesmen: (Canada) Denise Caughey (United States) Kate Connolly
M. Karvinen – 15:27 / 1–0			Referee: (United States) Kristine Langley; Linesmen: (Canada) Denise Caughey (United States) Kate Connolly
6 min	Penalties	10 min	Referee: (United States) Kristine Langley; Linesmen: (Canada) Denise Caughey (United States) Kate Connolly
43	Shots	13	Referee: (United States) Kristine Langley; Linesmen: (Canada) Denise Caughey (United States) Kate Connolly

6 April 2013; 19:30	Switzerland	1–2 (0–1, 1–0, 0–1)	Russia	Scotiabank Place, Ottawa; Attendance: 5,839

Game reference

Florence Schelling
Goalies
Nadezhda Alexandrova
Referee:
(Germany) Nicole Hertrich
Linesmen:
(Canada) Stephanie Gagnon
(Czech Republic) Ilona Novotná

	0–1	12:48 – T. Burina (G. Skiba)
S. Benz (P. Stanz, E. Raselli) (PP) – 36:57	1–1
	1–2	48:38 – Y. Smolentseva

10 min
Penalties
14 min
19
Shots
30

==== Semifinals ====
8 April 2013; 15:30	United States	3–0 (0–0, 0–0, 3–0)	Finland	Scotiabank Place, Ottawa; Attendance: 4,035

Game reference

Jessica Vetter
Goalies
Noora Räty
Referee:
(United Kingdom) Joy Tottman
Linesmen:
(Canada) Stephanie Gagnon
(Slovakia) Michaela Kúdelová

H. Knight (G. Marvin A. Kessel) – 53:55	1–0
M. Lamoureux-Kolls (A. Carpenter J. Lamoureux) – 55:32	2–0
B. Decker (M. Duggan) (ENG) – 59:43	3–0

12 min
Penalties
18 min
43
Shots
11

8 April 2013; 19:30	Canada	8–1 (1–0, 5–1, 2–0)	Russia	Scotiabank Place, Ottawa; Attendance: 7,255

Game reference

Shannon Szabados
Goalies
Anna Prugova
Yulia Leskina
Referee:
(Norway) Aina Hove
Linesmen:
(Czech Republic) Ilona Novotná
(Czech Republic) Zuzana Svobodová

H. Irwin (M. Mikkelson Reid, S. Szabados) – 19:13	1–0
N. Spooner (G. Apps, S. Vaillancourt) – 22:03	2–0
M.P. Poulin (B. Jenner) – 22:55	3–0
J. Wakefield (C. Ward, L. Fortino) – 24:29	4–0
	4–1	30:56 – S. Tkachyova (T. Burina, Y. Lebedeva)
J. Hefford (M.P. Poulin) (SH) – 32:18	5–1
M.P. Poulin (J. Hefford, T. Bonhomme) – 35:56	6–1
M. Agosta-Marciano (J. Wakefield) – 42:16	7–1
R. Johnston (C. Ward, M. Mikkelson) – 42:40	8–1

10 min
Penalties
6 min
49
Shots
18

==== Fifth place game ====
8 April 2013; 11:30	Switzerland	3–5 (1–1, 0–3, 2–1)	Germany	Scotiabank Place, Ottawa; Attendance: 4,008

Game reference

Florence Schelling
Goalies
Viona Harrer
Referee:
(France) Marie Picavet
Linesmen:
(Sweden) Therese Bjorkman
(Finland) Johanna Tauriainen

J. Marty (PS) – 09:20	1–0
	1–1	09:57 – M. Delarbre (S. Seiler, K. Spielberger)
	1–2	24:05 – F. Busch (M. Anwander)
	1–3	25:37 – F. Busch (S. Götz, S. Fellner) (PP)
	1–4	39:11 – L. Schuster (N. Kamenik, D. Gleissner)
J. Lutz (N. Bullo, S. Marty) – 50:28	2–4
	2–5	58:55 – M. Anwander (ENG)
J. Lutz (K. Nabholz, I. Waidacher) – 59:49	3–5

8 min
Penalties
4 min
30
Shots
25

==== Bronze medal game ====
9 April 2013; 15:30	Russia	2–0 (0–0, 0–0, 2–0)	Finland	Scotiabank Place, Ottawa; Attendance: 5,618

Game reference
Nadezhda Alexandrova	Goalies	Noora Räty	Referee: (United Kingdom) Joy Tottman; Linesmen: (Canada) Denise Caughey (United States) Laura Johnson
A. Shibanova (Y. Lebedeva, A. Kapustina) (PP) – 44:11 / 1–0; A. Vafina (ENG) – 59:44 / 2–0			Referee: (United Kingdom) Joy Tottman; Linesmen: (Canada) Denise Caughey (United States) Laura Johnson
12 min	Penalties	8 min	Referee: (United Kingdom) Joy Tottman; Linesmen: (Canada) Denise Caughey (United States) Laura Johnson
17	Shots	32	Referee: (United Kingdom) Joy Tottman; Linesmen: (Canada) Denise Caughey (United States) Laura Johnson

==== Final ====
9 April 2013; 19:30	Canada	2–3 (1–0, 1–2, 0–1)	United States	Scotiabank Place, Ottawa; Attendance: 13,776

Game reference

Shannon Szabados
Goalies
Jessie Vetter
Referee:
(Germany) Nicole Hertrich
Linesmen:
(Czech Republic) Ilona Novotná
(Czech Republic) Zuzana Svobodová

C. Birchard (C. Ouellette, M.P. Poulin) – 09:50	1–0
	1–1	22:43 – B. Decker (K. Coyne)
	1–2	34:26 – M. Bozek (A. Schleper, K. Coyne) (PP2)
C. Ouellette (C. Ward, M.P. Poulin) (PP) – 37:50	2–2
	2–3	43:09 – A. Kessel (G. Marvin, J. Vetter)

12 min
Penalties
6 min
16
Shots
30

=== Final standings ===
Rank	Team
1st place, gold medalist(s)	United States
2nd place, silver medalist(s)	Canada
3rd place, bronze medalist(s)	Russia
4	Finland
5	Germany
6	Switzerland
7	Sweden
8	Czech Republic

Relegated to the 2014 Division I A

=== Statistics and awards ===
==== Scoring leaders ====
List shows the top 10 skaters sorted by points, then goals.

Player	GP	G	A	Pts	+/−	PIM
(Canada) Marie-Philip Poulin	5	6	6	12	+12	2
(United States) Brianna Decker	5	6	2	8	+8	4
(Canada) Jenn Wakefield	5	4	4	8	+5	2
(United States) Amanda Kessel	5	2	6	8	+6	0
(Canada) Sarah Vaillancourt	5	2	5	7	+8	2
(Canada) Catherine Ward	5	1	6	7	+7	18
(Canada) Meghan Agosta-Marciano	5	4	2	6	+7	0
(Canada) Brianne Jenner	5	4	2	6	+6	2
(Canada) Jayna Hefford	5	2	4	6	+11	2
(Canada) Haley Irwin	5	2	4	6	+8	2

GP = Games played; G = Goals; A = Assists; Pts = Points; +/− = Plus/minus; PIM = Penalties In Minutes
Source: IIHF.COM

==== Leading goaltenders ====
Only the top five goaltenders, based on save percentage, who have played 40% of their team's minutes are included in this list.

Player	TOI	SA	GA	GAA	Sv%	SO
(Russia) Nadezhda Alexandrova	209:44	73	1	0.29	98.63	2
(Sweden) Sara Grahn	211:06	67	3	0.85	95.52	1
(Germany) Jennifer Harß	120:53	76	4	1.99	94.74	0
(Canada) Shannon Szabados	243:35	93	6	1.48	93.55	1
(Switzerland) Florence Schelling	237:51	159	13	3.28	91.82	0

TOI = Time On Ice (minutes:seconds); SA = Shots against; GA = Goals against; GAA = Goals against average; Sv% = Save percentage; SO = Shutouts
Source: IIHF.com

==== Tournament Awards ====
- Media All-Stars
  - Goaltender: Noora Räty (FIN)
  - Defense: Meaghan Mikkelson Reid (CAN), Catherine Ward (CAN)
  - Forwards: Marie-Philip Poulin (CAN), Brianna Decker (USA), Jenn Wakefield (CAN)
- Best players selected by the directorate:
  - Best Goaltender: Nadezhda Alexandrova (RUS)
  - Best Defenceman: Jenni Hiirikoski (FIN)
  - Best Forward: Marie-Philip Poulin (CAN)

== Division I ==
=== Group A ===
The Division I Group A tournament was played in Stavanger, Norway, from April 7 to 13, 2013.

The winners of the Division I Group A were initially presumed to be promoted to the 2015 Top Division. However, with the Divisions I and II playing in an Olympic year, and the eight Olympic entries being in none of those tournaments, it was determined that the last-placed Olympic team will play a challenge series with the 2014 Division I Group A champion for promotion to the 2015 Top Division. So Japan, as the last team of the 2014 Olympics, did not participate in the World Championships in 2014 and advanced to the 2015 Top Division playoff.

Pos	Team	Pld	W	OTW	OTL	L	GF	GA	GD	Pts	Relegation
1	Japan	5	4	0	1	0	17	7	+10	13	
2	Denmark	5	3	1	0	1	15	9	+6	11	
3	Slovakia	5	3	0	0	2	15	10	+5	9	
4	Austria	5	2	0	1	2	15	16	−1	7	
5	Norway (H)	5	1	1	0	3	13	15	−2	5	
6	Latvia	5	0	0	0	5	9	27	−18	0	Relegated to the 2014 Division I B

Source: IIHF
(H) Host

=== Group B ===
The Division I Group B tournament was played in Strasbourg, France, from April 7 to 13, 2013.

Pos	Team	Pld	W	OTW	OTL	L	GF	GA	GD	Pts	Promotion or relegation
1	France (H)	5	5	0	0	0	23	4	+19	15	Promoted to the 2014 Division I A
2	Netherlands	5	3	1	0	1	16	12	+4	11	
3	North Korea	5	1	1	1	2	12	17	−5	6	
4	China	5	2	0	0	3	15	15	0	6	
5	Kazakhstan	5	1	1	0	3	12	16	−4	5	
6	Great Britain	5	0	0	2	3	8	22	−14	2	Relegated to the 2014 Division II A

Source: IIHF
(H) Host

== Division II ==
=== Group A ===
The Division II Group A tournament was played in Auckland, New Zealand, from April 8 to 14, 2013.

Pos	Team	Pld	W	OTW	OTL	L	GF	GA	GD	Pts	Promotion or relegation
1	Hungary	5	4	0	0	1	27	12	+15	12	Promoted to the 2014 Division I B
2	Italy	5	4	0	0	1	18	8	+10	12	
3	Australia	5	3	0	0	2	21	17	+4	9	
4	New Zealand (H)	5	2	0	1	2	14	20	−6	7	
5	Poland	5	1	1	0	3	10	16	−6	5	
6	Slovenia	5	0	0	0	5	10	27	−17	0	Relegated to the 2014 Division II B

Source: IIHF
(H) Host

=== Group B ===
The Division II Group B tournament was played in Puigcerdà, Spain, from April 1 to 7, 2013.

Pos	Team	Pld	W	OTW	OTL	L	GF	GA	GD	Pts	Promotion or relegation
1	South Korea	5	5	0	0	0	20	3	+17	15	Promoted to the 2014 Division II A
2	Spain (H)	5	4	0	0	1	23	7	+16	12	
3	Croatia	5	2	1	0	2	26	15	+11	8	
4	Iceland	5	1	1	0	3	13	15	−2	5	
5	Belgium	5	1	0	2	2	12	10	+2	5	
6	South Africa	5	0	0	0	5	6	50	−44	0	Relegated to the 2014 Division II B Qualification

Source: IIHF
(H) Host

=== Group B Qualification ===
The Division II Group B Qualification tournament was played in İzmir, Turkey, from December 7 to 9, 2012.

Pos	Team	Pld	W	OTW	OTL	L	GF	GA	GD	Pts	Promotion
1	Turkey (H)	2	2	0	0	0	11	4	+7	6	Promoted to the 2014 Division II B
2	Bulgaria	2	1	0	0	1	9	5	+4	3	
3	Ireland	2	0	0	0	2	2	13	−11	0	

Source: IIHF
(H) Host

== See also ==
- 2013 IIHF World Women's U18 Championship
