= Franziska Busch =

German ice hockey player and coach

- Born: 20 October 1985 (age 39); Seesen, West Germany
- Height: 1.62 m (5 ft 4 in)
- Weight: 67 kg (148 lb; 10 st 8 lb)
- Position: Forward
- Shot: Left
- Played for: ECDC Memmingen; OSC Eisladies Berlin
- National team: Germany
- Playing career: 2003–2016

Franziska Busch (born 20 October 1985) is a German retired ice hockey forward and former alternate captain of the German national ice hockey team. She currently serves as the head coach of the German women's national under-18 ice hockey team.

== International career ==
Busch was selected to represent Germany at the Winter Olympic Games in 2006 and 2014. At the women's ice hockey tournament in 2006, she did not record a point across five games. At the women's ice hockey tournament in 2014, she led the team in scoring with three goals and five points.

She played in the 2006, 2010 and 2014 Olympic qualification tournaments.

Busch also played with Germany at eight IIHF Women's World Championships. Her first appearance came in 2004.

== Career statistics ==
=== International career ===
Year	Team	Event	GP	G	A	Pts	PIM
2004	Germany	WW	4	0	0	0	0
2004	Germany	OGQ	3	0	2	2	0
2005	Germany	WW	5	0	1	1	2
2006	Germany	OG	5	0	0	0	4
2007	Germany	WW	4	1	0	1	0
2008	Germany	WW	3	0	0	0	0
2008	Germany	OGQ	3	1	0	1	2
2009	Germany	WW DI	5	1	3	4	0
2011	Germany	WW DI	4	1	1	2	0
2012	Germany	WW	5	0	2	2	2
2013	Germany	OGQ	3	0	3	3	2
2013	Germany	WW	5	4	1	5	4
2014	Germany	OG	5	3	2	5	2
