= Silvia Toffano =

Italian ice hockey player

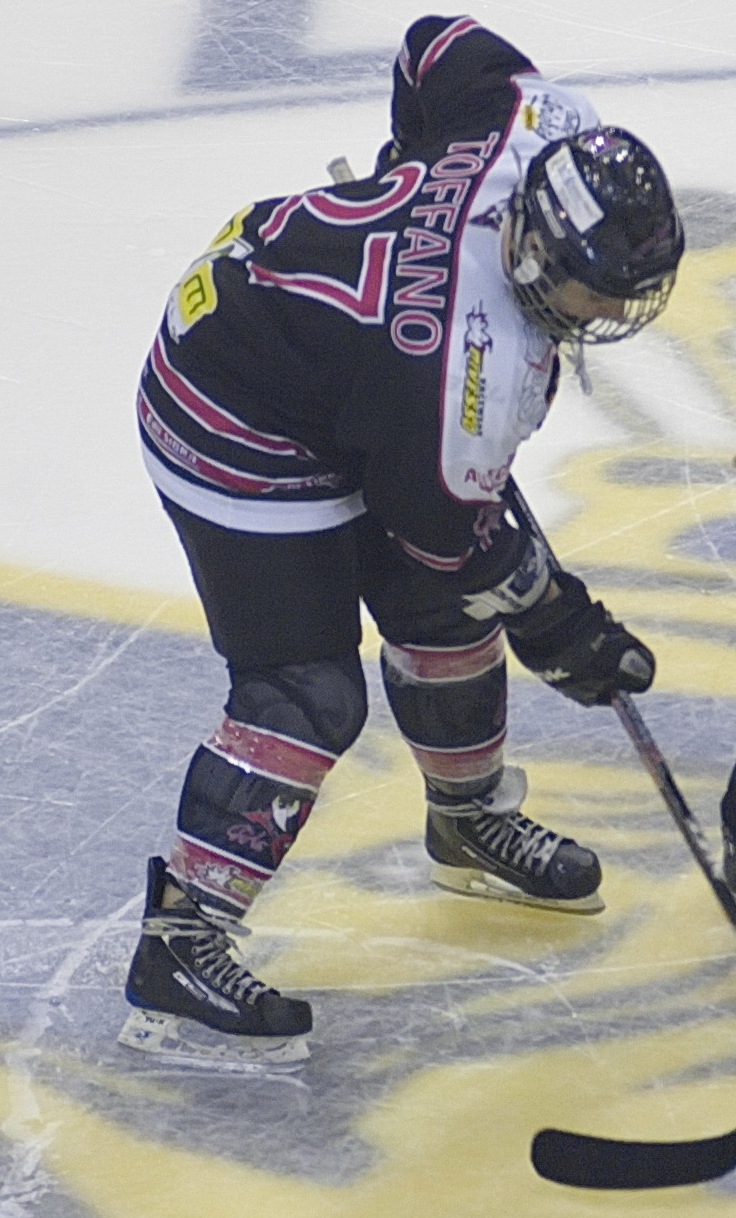
- Born: 5 January 1985 (age 41) Venice, Italy
- Height: 163 cm (5 ft 4 in)
- Weight: 52 kg (115 lb; 8 st 3 lb)
- Position: Forward
- Shoots: Right
- Played for: Eagles Bolzano
- National team: Italy
- Playing career: 2000–present

Silvia Toffano (born 5 January 1985) is an Italian ice hockey player. She competed in the women's tournament at the 2006 Winter Olympics.
