= Sabrina Kruck =

German ice hockey player

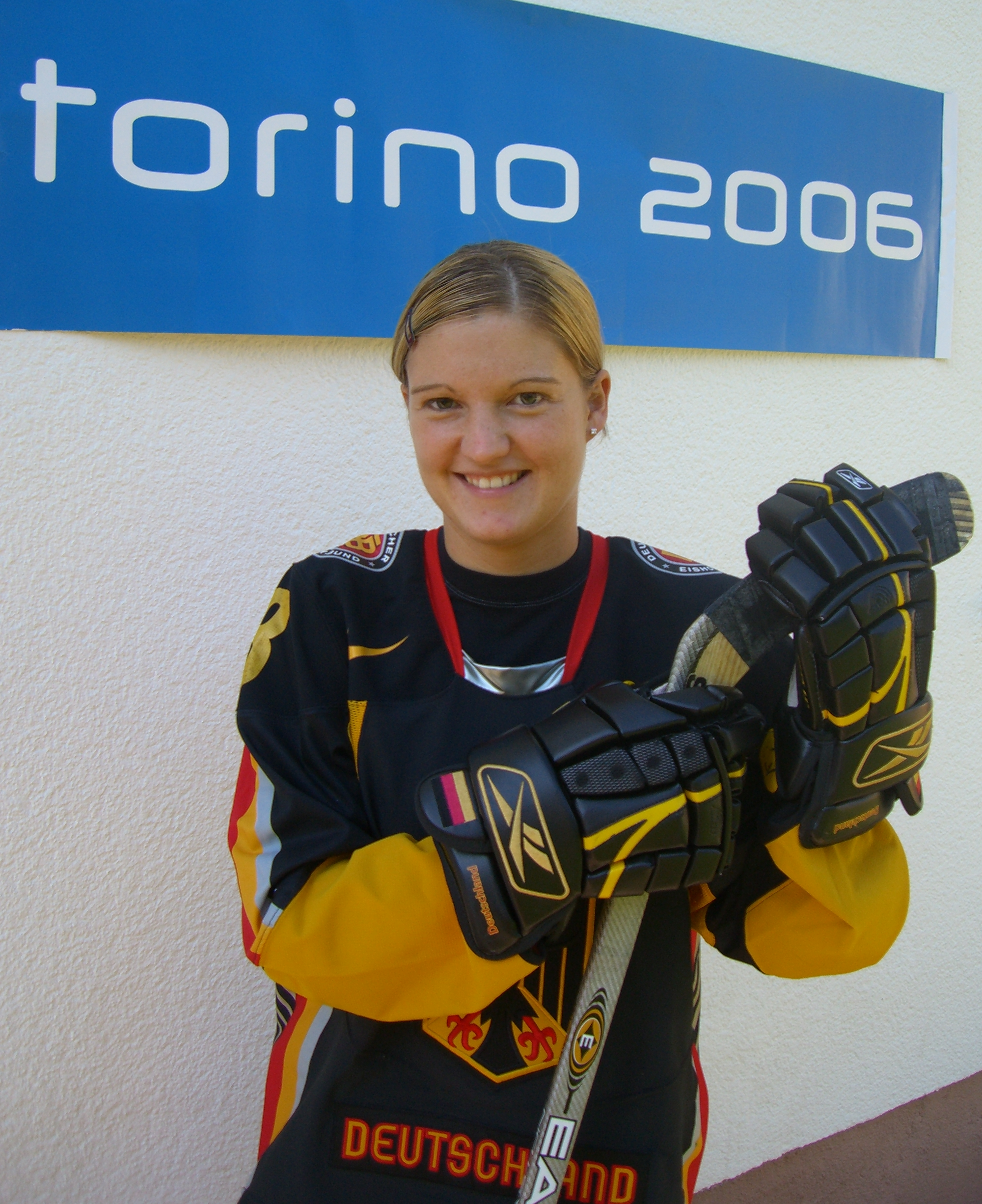
- Kruck in 2006

Personal information
- Nationality: German
- Born: 3 November 1981 (age 43); Starnberg, Germany

Sport
- Sport: Ice hockey

Sabrina Kruck (born 3 November 1981) is a German ice hockey player. She competed in the women's tournaments at the 2002 Winter Olympics and the 2006 Winter Olympics.
