= Monika Leuenberger =

Swiss ice hockey player

- Born: 11 April 1973 (age 52); Zürich, Switzerland
- Height: 179 cm (5 ft 10 in)
- Weight: 83 kg (183 lb; 13 st 1 lb)
- Position: Defence
- Shot: Right
- Played for: EV Zug
- National team: Switzerland
- Playing career: 1989–2017

Monika Leuenberger (born 11 April 1973) is a Swiss ice hockey player. She competed in the women's tournament at the 2006 Winter Olympics.
