= Raffi Wolf =

German ice hockey player

- Born: 20 June 1978 (age 46); Dinslaken, West Germany
- Height: 5 ft 6 in (168 cm)
- Weight: 143 lb (65 kg; 10 st 3 lb)
- Position: Forward
- Hockey East GER team: Maine Black Bears; ESC Planegg-Wurmtall
- National team: Germany
- Playing career: 1998–present

Raffaela Wolf (born 20 June 1978) is a German female ice hockey player. She played forward position.

== Playing career ==
=== Germany ===
Wolf was born in Dinslaken, West Germany.

She competed at two IIHF Women's World Championships. Her team finished 5th (Pool A) in 2001 and 7th (Pool A) in 2000. She represented Germany in the Germany women's national ice hockey team at the Winter Olympic Games. She competed in the 2002 Olympics and at the 2006 Olympics.

== Career stats ==
=== IIHF Worlds ===
Event	Games played	G	A	Pts
2000 Worlds	5	0	0	0
2001 Worlds	5	1	0	1

=== Olympics ===
Event	Games played	G	A	Pts	PIM
2002 Olympics	5	0	1	1	4
2006 Olympics	5	0	0	0	

=== NCAA ===
Year	Games played	G	A	Pts
2000-01	20	7	8	15
2002-03	31	2	11	13

== Awards and honors ==
- 2002-03 Hockey East All-Academic Team

== See also ==
- Germany women's national ice hockey team
