= Ramona Fuhrer =

Swiss ice hockey player

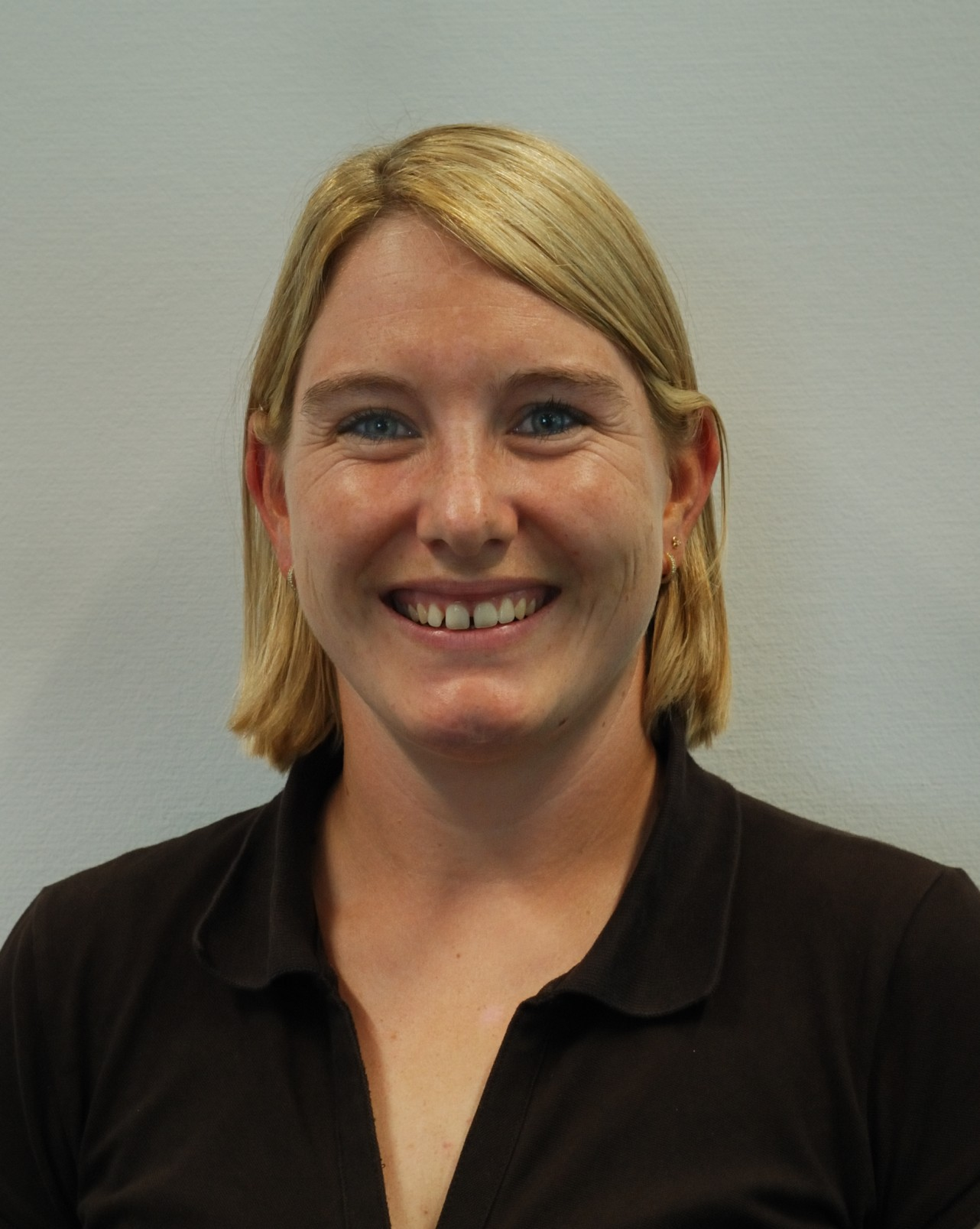
- Ramona Fuhrer in 2008
- Born: 13 April 1979 (age 46); Aarberg, Switzerland
- Height: 163 cm (5 ft 4 in)
- Weight: 68 kg (150 lb; 10 st 10 lb)
- Position: Defence
- Shot: Left
- Played for: DHC Lyss
- National team: Switzerland
- Playing career: 1991–2009

Ramona Fuhrer-Weisskopf (born 13 April 1979) is a Swiss ice hockey player. She competed in the women's tournament at the 2006 Winter Olympics.
