= Sara Seiler =

German ice hockey player (born 1983)

- Born: January 25, 1983 (age 42); Hausham, West Germany
- Height: 5 ft 6 in (168 cm)
- Weight: 139 lb (63 kg; 9 st 13 lb)
- Position: Forward
- CIS team: Carleton Ravens (2007–11)
- National team: Germany
- Playing career: 2005–present

Sara Seiler (born January 25, 1983) played as a forward for the Carleton Ravens women's ice hockey team in U Sports women's ice hockey. She also represented Germany at the 2013 IIHF Women's World Championship and competed in Ice hockey at the 2014 Winter Olympics – Women's tournament.

== Playing career ==
In the 2006–07 season, Seiler played for the Ottawa Raiders, a team competing in the now-defunct NWHL. Throughout the regular season, she appeared in 32 games.

=== Carleton Ravens ===
Seiler made history as the first European player to be named captain of the Carleton Ravens women's ice hockey team. Ahead of the 2013 IIHF Women's World Championship, the Germany women's national ice hockey team used the Carleton Ice House as their training base. Seiler, a former Ravens captain, was part of the German national team during this time. As part of their preparations, the Ravens hosted Germany for an exhibition match, where the German side earned a 3–0 victory with goals from Julia Zorn, Franziska Busch, and Andrea Lanzl.

=== International ===
Seiler proudly represented Germany as a member of the German women's ice hockey team during the 2006 Winter Olympics, held in Torino, Italy. In 2011, she was selected to participate in the inaugural International Ice Hockey Federation (IIHF) High Performance Women's Camp, which took place from July 5 to 12 in Bratislava, Slovakia. At the camp, Seiler represented Germany, engaging in training sessions, workshops, and leadership activities designed to elevate the sport's profile and cultivate the next generation of female hockey leaders.

== See also ==
- Germany women's national ice hockey team
