= Germany women's national ice hockey team =

Germany
- Nickname: Träger der Adler ('The Eagle Carriers')
- Association: German Ice Hockey Federation
- General manager: Ronja Jenike
- Head coach: Jeff MacLeod
- Assistants: Markus Gleich; Cody Lampl; Sascha Rogoza
- Captain: Daria Gleißner
- Most games: Andrea Lanzl (331)
- Top scorer: Maritta Becker (87)
- Most points: Maritta Becker (184)
- Team colors
- IIHF code: GER
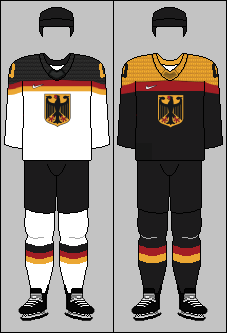

Ranking
- Current IIHF: 7 ▲1 (3 June 2026)
- Highest IIHF: 5 (first in 2005)
- Lowest IIHF: 11 (2010)

First international
- Switzerland 6–5 West Germany (Geretsried, West Germany; 3 December 1988)

Biggest win
- Germany 22–0 Turkey (Bad Tölz, Germany; 15 February 2016)

Biggest defeat
- Finland 17–1 Germany (Lake Placid, United States; 11 April 1994); United States 16–0 Germany (Lake Placid, United States; 12 April 1994)

Olympics
- Appearances: 4 (first in 2002)

World Championships
- Appearances: 23 (first in 1994)
- Best result: 4th (2017)

European Championships
- Appearances: 4 (first in 1991)
- Best result: 4th (1995)

International record (W–L–T)
- 242–323–24

The German women's national ice hockey team represents Germany at the International Ice Hockey Federation (IIHF) Women's World Championship and other international ice hockey tournaments. The women's national team was ranked eighth in the IIHF World Ranking in 2025. It is organized under the direct administration of the German Ice Hockey Federation (Deutscher Eishockey-Bund, DEB).

Women's participation in ice hockey in Germany has slowly increased in the past decades – in 2011 the country had 2,549 female players registered with the IIHF and reported 3,168 in 2025.

== History ==
The first international game for the German women's national team took place on 3 December 1988 in Geretsried against Switzerland. The final score was 6–5 for the Swiss, but the Germans avenged the loss in their second match. Against the Swiss, the Germans obtained their first victory.

In preparation for the 2013 IIHF Women's World Championship, the Carleton Ice House, home of the Carleton Ravens women's ice hockey program, served as the training facility for the German team. Former Ravens team captain Sara Seiler served as a member of the German squad. Of note, the Ravens hosted Germany in an exhibition game, which saw the Germans prevail by a 3–0 tally, with goals from Julia Zorn, Franziska Busch, and Andrea Lanzl.

Germany's best finish at the Worlds was in 2017, where they finished fourth after an upset victory over Russia in the quarterfinals.

In the third game of Group B preliminary round play at the 2024 IIHF Women's World Championship, Franziska Feldmeier scored the game winning goal in third period versus Sweden in an April 8 match. With the win, Germany clinched first place in Group B competition. Sandra Abstreiter made 32 saves to register a shutout. As a side note, it marked the first time that Germany won four games at a Women's Worlds.

Abstreiter was recognized with the Directorate Award for Best Goaltender at the 2024 Worlds, posting a 1.19 Goals Against Average. In addition, she was one of seven finalists for the IIHF 2024 Women's Player of the Year Award.

With Germany appearing at the 2026 Winter Olympics, their first since 2014, the February 5, 2026 match versus Sweden meant that every member of the German roster were making their Olympic debut.

In the 2026 Olympic quarterfinals against Canada, Franziska Feldmeier scored on Emerance Maschmeyer in a 5-1 loss on February 14. It was the first ever goal for Germany versus Canada in senior play.

== Tournament record ==
=== Olympic ===
- 2002 – Finished in 6th place
- 2006 – Finished in 5th place
- 2014 – Finished in 6th place
- 2026 – Finished in 7th place

=== World Championship ===
- 1990 – Finished in 7th place (as West Germany)
- 1994 – Finished in 8th place
- 1999 – Finished in 7th place
- 2000 – Finished in 7th place
- 2001 – Finished in 5th place
- 2004 – Finished in 6th place
- 2005 – Finished in 5th place
- 2007 – Finished in 8th place
- 2008 – Finished in 9th place (relegated to Division I)
- 2009 – Finished in 11th place (2nd in Division I)
- 2011 – Finished in 9th place (1st in Division I, promoted to Top Division)
- 2012 – Finished in 7th place
- 2013 – Finished in 5th place
- 2015 – Finished in 8th place (relegated to Division IA)
- 2016 – Finished in 9th place (1st in Division IA, promoted to Top Division)
- 2017 – Finished in 4th place
- 2019 – Finished in 7th place
- 2020 – Cancelled due to the coronavirus pandemic
- 2021 – Finished in 8th place
- 2022 – Finished in 9th place
- 2023 – Finished in 8th place
- 2024 – Finished in 6th place
- 2025 – Finished in 8th place
- 2026 – Finished in 5th place

=== IIHF European Cup of Nations ===
- 2026–27 – (Group A)

=== European Championship ===
- 1989 – Won bronze medal (as West Germany)
- 1991 – Finished in 6th place
- 1993 – Finished in 4th place
- 1995 – Finished in 5th place
- 1996 – Finished in 6th place

== Team ==
=== Current roster ===
Roster for the 2026 IIHF Women's World Championship.

Head coach: Jeff MacLeod

No.	Pos.	Name	Height	Weight	Birthdate	Team
7	F	Franziska Feldmeier	1.65 m (5 ft 5 in)	67 kg (148 lb)	5 February 1999 (age 27)	(Germany) Eisbären Juniors Berlin
8	D	Ronja Hark – A	1.58 m (5 ft 2 in)	60 kg (130 lb)	17 August 2003 (age 23)	(Germany) ECDC Memmingen
9	F	Svenja Voigt	1.65 m (5 ft 5 in)	60 kg (130 lb)	29 March 2004 (age 22)	(Sweden) Färjestad BK
10	D	Emilija Birka	1.66 m (5 ft 5 in)	59 kg (130 lb)	26 March 2009 (age 17)	(Germany) EC Bad Tölz U17
11	F	Nicola Hadraschek	1.66 m (5 ft 5 in)	67 kg (148 lb)	10 September 1996 (age 30)	(Germany) ECDC Memmingen
12	F	Aileena Dopheide	1.73 m (5 ft 8 in)	65 kg (143 lb)	30 September 2000 (age 26)	(Germany) ERC Ingolstadt
13	F	Luisa Welcke	1.66 m (5 ft 5 in)	70 kg (150 lb)	29 April 2002 (age 24)	(Germany) Mad Dogs Mannheim
14	D	Carina Strobel	1.72 m (5 ft 8 in)	64 kg (141 lb)	11 September 1997 (age 29)	(Germany) ECDC Memmingen
16	F	Jule Schiefer	1.74 m (5 ft 9 in)	69 kg (152 lb)	12 September 2001 (age 25)	(Germany) ECDC Memmingen
17	F	Emily Nix	1.74 m (5 ft 9 in)	79 kg (174 lb)	12 January 1998 (age 28)	(Sweden) Frölunda HC
19	F	Marie-Kristin Schmid	1.65 m (5 ft 5 in)	58 kg (128 lb)	15 December 1996 (age 29)	(Germany) ECDC Memmingen
20	D	Daria Gleißner – C	1.71 m (5 ft 7 in)	72 kg (159 lb)	30 June 1993 (age 33)	(Germany) ECDC Memmingen
21	D	Tabea Botthof	1.76 m (5 ft 9 in)	78 kg (172 lb)	1 June 2000 (age 26)	(Germany) Mad Dogs Mannheim
23	F	Lilli Welcke	1.66 m (5 ft 5 in)	70 kg (150 lb)	29 April 2002 (age 24)	(Germany) Mad Dogs Mannheim
24	F	Alexandra Boico	1.74 m (5 ft 9 in)	68 kg (150 lb)	12 June 2009 (age 17)	(United States) Bishop Kearney Selects
25	F	Laura Kluge – A	1.80 m (5 ft 11 in)	63 kg (139 lb)	6 November 1996 (age 30)	(United States) Boston Fleet
26	D	Tara Schmitz	1.66 m (5 ft 5 in)	63 kg (139 lb)	16 March 1998 (age 28)	(Germany) Mad Dogs Mannheim
28	D	Nina Jobst-Smith	1.70 m (5 ft 7 in)	69 kg (152 lb)	30 August 2001 (age 25)	(United States) Detroit Clutch
29	F	Nina Christof	1.65 m (5 ft 5 in)	70 kg (150 lb)	18 August 2003 (age 23)	(Sweden) MoDo Hockey
34	F	Celina Haider	1.70 m (5 ft 7 in)	60 kg (130 lb)	20 July 2000 (age 26)	(Germany) Eisbären Juniors Berlin
35	G	Sandra Abstreiter	1.81 m (5 ft 11 in)	78 kg (172 lb)	23 July 1998 (age 28)	(Canada) Hamilton Havoc
41	F	Mathilda Heine	1.69 m (5 ft 7 in)	68 kg (150 lb)	18 February 2009 (age 17)	(Germany) Eisbären Juniors Berlin
46	D	Hanna Weichenhain	1.72 m (5 ft 8 in)	66 kg (146 lb)	18 October 2008 (age 18)	(Germany) Eisbären Juniors Berlin
47	F	Anabel Seyrer	1.67 m (5 ft 6 in)	58 kg (128 lb)	22 April 2008 (age 18)	(United States) Norwich Cadets
70	G	Lisa Hemmerle	1.67 m (5 ft 6 in)	63 kg (139 lb)	11 December 1995 (age 30)	(Germany) ERC Ingolstadt
75	G	Chiara Schultes	1.68 m (5 ft 6 in)	64 kg (141 lb)	22 July 2005 (age 21)	(Germany) ECDC Memmingen

=== Notable former players ===
- Claudia Grundmann
- Michaela Lanzl
- Christina Oswald
- Denise Soesilo
- Raffaela Wolf

=== Former coaches ===
- 1988–1989: Pia Sterner
- 1989–1990: Pierre Delisle
- 1990–1994: Hanspeter Amend
- 1994–1995: Alfred Neidhart
- 1995–2002: Rainer Nittel
- 2002–2014: Peter Kathan
- 2014–2018: Benjamin Hinterstocker
- 2018–2019: Christian Künast
- 2020–2021: Franziska Busch
- 2021–2023: Thomas Schädler
- 2023–present: Jeff MacLeod
