= Claudia Grundmann =

German ice hockey player

Personal information
- Nationality: German
- Born: 22 April 1976 (age 48); Berlin, Germany

Sport
- Sport: Ice hockey

Claudia Grundmann (born 22 April 1976) is a German ice hockey player. She competed in the women's tournaments at the 2002 Winter Olympics and the 2006 Winter Olympics.
