= 1999 IIHF Women's World Championship =

Tournament details
- Host country: Finland
- Venues: 2 (in 2 host cities)
- Dates: March 8–14, 1999
- Opened by: Martti Ahtisaari
- Teams: 8

Final positions
- Champions: Canada (5th title)
- Runners-up: United States
- Third place: Finland
- Fourth place: Sweden

Tournament statistics
- Games played: 20
- Goals scored: 138 (6.9 per game)
- Attendance: 25,234 (1,262 per game)
- Scoring leader: (United States) Jenny Schmidgall 12 points

The 1999 IIHF Women's World Championships was held between March 8–14, 1999, in Espoo and Vantaa in Finland. Team Canada won their fifth consecutive gold medal at the World Championships defeating the United States. Canada skated to a solid 3–1 victory in the final to take the gold with a solid performance that saw them winning all five games.

Finland picked up their fifth consecutive bronze medal, with a win over Sweden who had their strongest performance since 1992.

== Qualification ==
The 1999 tournament created the format that has remained to the present, as the World Championships was greatly expanded to incorporate the European Championships and the Pacific Qualification Tournaments. There were a series of Qualification Tournaments Held to assign teams places in this first year, with the standard Promotion and Relegation model following after that. The top five nations from the Nagano Olympics were joined by three qualifiers.

- Top five at the Olympics:
  - United States
  - Canada
  - Finland
  - China
  - Sweden
- Qualifiers from world tournaments:
  - Germany - Final Qualification group A winner
  - Switzerland - Final Qualification group B winner
  - Russia - Won playoff against Norway for final spot

== World Championship Group A ==
The eight participating teams were divided up into two seeded groups as below. The teams played each other once in a single round robin format. The top two teams from the group proceeded to the Final Round, while the remaining teams played in the consolation round.

== First round ==
=== Group A ===
==== Standings ====
| Pos | Team | Pld | W | D | L | GF | GA | GD | Pts | Qualification |
|---|---|---|---|---|---|---|---|---|---|---|
| 1 | United States | 3 | 3 | 0 | 0 | 27 | 2 | +25 | 6 | Advanced to Final round |
| 2 | Sweden | 3 | 2 | 0 | 1 | 10 | 12 | −2 | 4 | Advanced to Final round |
| 3 | China | 3 | 1 | 0 | 2 | 4 | 11 | −7 | 2 | Sent to Consolation round |
| 4 | Russia | 3 | 0 | 0 | 3 | 4 | 20 | −16 | 0 | Sent to Consolation round |

Source: Hockey Canada

==== Results ====
All times local

| March 8, 1999; 4:30 pm | United States | 10 – 2 (2 - 2, 4 - 0, 4 - 0) | Russia | Espoo |

Looney 08:08; Schmidgall 17:57; Granato 26:03; Bye 31:53; Schmidgall 34:43; Wendell 35:29; Looney 44:02; King 46:11; Fisher 53:35; Dunn 53:51 / Goals / Tsareva 14:22; Bourina 16:01

| March 8, 1999; 4:30 pm | China | 1 – 3 | Sweden | Vantaa |

| March 9, 1999; 8:00 pm | Sweden | 0 – 11 (0 - 3, 0 - 4, 0 - 4) | United States | Vantaa |

Goals / Ruggiero 00:58; Schmidgall 6:35; O'Sullivan 19:33; Bye 27:05; Merz 29:05; Grantato 34:50; King 36:34; Dunn 43:27; Granato 44:11; King 46:21; Wendell 58:11

| March 9, 1999; 4:30 pm | China | 3 – 2 | Russia | Vantaa |

| March 11, 1999; 4:30 pm | Russia | 0 – 7 | Sweden | Espoo |

| March 11, 1999; 8:00 pm | United States | 6 – 0 (1 - 0, 2 - 0, 3 - 0) | China | Vantaa |

King 12:15; Schmidgall 25:59; Bye 36:52; Bye 42:20; Fisher 56:33; Bye 58:36 / Goals

=== Group B ===
==== Standings ====
| Pos | Team | Pld | W | D | L | GF | GA | GD | Pts | Qualification |
|---|---|---|---|---|---|---|---|---|---|---|
| 1 | Canada | 3 | 3 | 0 | 0 | 24 | 0 | +24 | 6 | Advanced to Final round |
| 2 | Finland | 3 | 2 | 0 | 1 | 16 | 1 | +15 | 4 | Advanced to Final round |
| 3 | Germany | 3 | 1 | 0 | 2 | 5 | 26 | −21 | 2 | Sent to Consolation round |
| 4 | Switzerland | 3 | 0 | 0 | 3 | 4 | 22 | −18 | 0 | Sent to Consolation round |

Source: Hockey Canada

==== Results ====
All times local

| March 8, 1999; 8:00 pm | Canada | 10 – 0 (2 - 0, 6 - 0, 2 - 0) | Switzerland | Vantaa |

Wickenheiser 13:00; Goyette 13:30; Wickenheiser 27:56; Hefford 30:50; Sunohara 31:34; Campbell 31:45; Dupuis 37:38; Benoit 38:27; Campbell 45:55; Hefford 49:43 / Goals

| March 8, 1999; 8:00 pm | Finland | 9 – 0 | Germany | Espoo |

| March 9, 1999; 4:30 pm | Germany | 0 – 13 (0 - 4, 0 - 6, 0 - 3) | Canada | Espoo |

Goals / Drolet 03:43; Wickenheiser 06:43; Ouellette 08:23; St-Louis 10:34; Drolet 22:05; Hefford 27:52; Kellar 31:16; Heaney 33:50; Hefford 35:13; Heaney 39:30; Rivard 51:41; Goyette 54:46; Botterill 57:07

| March 9, 1999; 8:00 pm | Finland | 7 – 0 | Switzerland | Espoo |

| March 11, 1999; 8:00 pm | Switzerland | 4 – 5 (0 - 0, 1 - 0, 0 - 0) | Germany | Vantaa |

| March 11, 1999; 8:00 pm | Canada | 1 – 0 | Finland | Espoo |

Sunohara 26:00 / Goals

== Playoff round ==
=== Consolation round 5–8 place ===
| March 12, 1999; 4:30 pm | Germany | 2 – 6 | Russia | Vantaa |

| March 12, 1999; 7:30 pm | China | 3 – 2 | Switzerland | Vantaa |

=== Consolation round 7–8 place ===
| March 14, 1999; 4:00 pm | Germany | 3 – 0 | Switzerland | Vantaa |

=== Consolation round 5–6 place ===
| March 14, 1999; 2:00 pm | Russia | 1 – 4 | China | Vantaa |

=== Final round ===
Semi finals 13 March 1999
A1 | United States | 3
B2 | Finland | 1
B1 | Canada | 4
A2 | Sweden | 1

Finals; 14 March 1999
Canada | 3
United States | 1
Bronze Medal Game
Finland | 8
Sweden | 2

=== Semifinals ===
| March 13, 1999; 2:00 pm | Canada | 4 – 1 (1 - 0, 1 - 1, 2 - 0) | Sweden | Espoo |

Drolet 18:14; Drolet 30:18; Hefford 47:27; St-Louis 57:10 / Goals / Mansson 26:17

| March 13, 1999; 7:30 pm | United States | 3 – 1 (0 - 1, 2 - 0, 1 - 0) | Finland | Espoo |

Darwitz 26:46; Darwitz 36:27; Wendell 55:00 / Goals / Hanninen 19:58

=== Match for third place ===
| March 14, 1999; 2:00 pm | Finland | 8 – 2 | Sweden | Espoo |

=== Final ===
| March 14, 1999; 6:00 pm | Canada | 3 – 1 | United States | Espoo |

== Champions ==
1999 IIHF World Women Championship winners

Canada
5th title

== Scoring leaders ==
| Player | GP | G | A | Pts | PIM | +/- |
|---|---|---|---|---|---|---|
| (United States) Jenny Schmidgall | 5 | 5 | 7 | 12 | 0 | 9 |
| (Canada) Jayna Hefford | 5 | 5 | 6 | 11 | 0 | 8 |
| (Finland) Kirsi Hanninen | 5 | 5 | 5 | 10 | 2 | 6 |
| (Finland) Petra Vaarakallio | 5 | 3 | 7 | 10 | 4 | 4 |
| (Finland) Sari Fisk | 5 | 4 | 5 | 9 | 0 | 3 |
| (United States) Karyn Bye | 5 | 5 | 3 | 8 | 2 | 6 |
| (Canada) Nancy Drolet | 5 | 4 | 4 | 8 | 0 | 6 |
| (United States) Cammi Granato | 5 | 3 | 5 | 8 | 0 | 9 |
| (Canada) Hayley Wickenheiser | 5 | 3 | 5 | 8 | 8 | 5 |
| (United States) Katie King | 5 | 4 | 3 | 7 | 2 | 6 |

== Goaltending leaders ==
| Player | Mins | GA | SOG | GAA | SV% |
|---|---|---|---|---|---|
| (Canada) Sami Jo Small | 180:00 | 1 | 56 | 0.33 | 98.21 |
| (Canada) Kim St-Pierre | 120:00 | 1 | 34 | 0.50 | 97.06 |
| (United States) Erin Whitten | 179:03 | 4 | 72 | 1.34 | 94.44 |
| (Finland) Tuula Puputti | 237:27 | 6 | 89 | 1.52 | 93.26 |
| (United States) Laurie Beliveau | 120:00 | 2 | 23 | 1.00 | 91.30 |

== Final standings ==
| Rk. | Team | Notes |
|---|---|---|
| 1st place, gold medalist(s) | Canada | |
| 2nd place, silver medalist(s) | United States | |
| 3rd place, bronze medalist(s) | Finland | |
| 4. | Sweden | |
| 5. | China | |
| 6. | Russia | |
| 7. | Germany | |
| 8. | Switzerland | Relegated to the 2000 World Championships Group B |

== World Championship Group B ==
In addition to the main World Championships, this year saw the first running of World Championship Group B, which replaced the European Championships. Eight further teams played in this competition, hosted by France in the town of Colmar. Japan won the tournament defeating Norway in the final 7-1 to win the competition and to ensure their Promotion to the main World Championship in 2000.

== Directorate Awards ==
- Goalie: Sami Jo Small, (Canada)
- Defender: Kirsi Hanninen, (Finland)
- Forward: Jenny Schmidgall, (United States)
