= 2000 IIHF Women's World Championship =

Tournament details
- Host country: Canada
- Venues: 7 (in 7 host cities)
- Dates: April 3–9, 2000
- Opened by: Adrienne Clarkson
- Teams: 8

Final positions
- Champions: Canada (6th title)
- Runners-up: United States
- Third place: Finland
- Fourth place: Sweden

Tournament statistics
- Games played: 20
- Goals scored: 148 (7.4 per game)
- Attendance: 57,444 (2,872 per game)
- Scoring leader: (United States) Krissy Wendell (13 points)

The 2000 IIHF Women's World Championships was held April 3–9, 2000 in the Ontario towns of Mississauga, Barrie, Kitchener, London, Niagara Falls, Oshawa and Peterborough, Canada. Final games were played at the Hershey Centre in Mississauga. Team Canada won their sixth consecutive gold medal at the World Championships defeating the United States.

In one of the closest finals competed, Canada took the tournament with a 2–1 final win, in overtime. Finland picked up their sixth consecutive bronze medal, with a win over Sweden.

This year's tournament also counted as qualification for the Salt Lake Olympics. With six automatic berths available, all four semi-finalists were assured Olympic participation. In the consolation round China defeated Germany and Russia defeated Japan, to join them.

== Teams ==
With the promotion and relegation format now in use, the top seven nations were joined by Japan, the winner of Group B in 1999.

- Canada
- China
- Finland
- Germany
- Japan
- Russia
- Sweden
- United States

== Venue ==
Mississauga, Canada
Host Venue	Details
Hershey Centre Arena Paramount Fine Foods Centre, 2015 (Hershey Centre Arena)	Location: (Canada) Mississauga, Canada; Constructed: 1998; Renamed: Paramount Fine Foods Centre Capacity: Ice Hockey: 5,612 (5,420 seated)⁣

== World Championship Group A ==
The eight participating teams were divided up into two seeded groups as below. The teams played each other once in a single round robin format. The top two teams from the group proceeded to the Final Round, while the remaining teams played in the Consolation Round.

== First round ==
=== Group A ===
==== Standings ====
Pos	Team	Pld	W	D	L	GF	GA	GD	Pts	Qualification
1	Canada	3	3	0	0	21	1	+20	6	Advanced to Final round
2	Sweden	3	1	1	1	11	5	+6	3	Advanced to Final round
3	China	3	1	1	1	5	9	−4	3	Sent to Consolation round
4	Japan	3	0	0	3	0	22	−22	0	Sent to Consolation round

Source: IIHF

==== Results ====
All times local

April 3, 2000; 7:30 pm	Japan	0 – 9	Canada	Hershey Centre

April 3, 2000; 7:00 pm	China	1 – 1	Sweden	Memorial Centre

April 4, 2000; 7:00 pm	Sweden	10 – 0	Japan	Memorial Arena

April 4, 2000; 7:30 pm	Canada	8 – 1	China	Memorial Aud.

April 6, 2000; 4:00 pm	China	3 – 0	Japan	Hershey Centre

April 6, 2000; 7:30 pm	Canada	4 – 0	Sweden	Hershey Centre

=== Group B ===
==== Standings ====
Pos	Team	Pld	W	D	L	GF	GA	GD	Pts	Qualification
1	United States	3	3	0	0	35	4	+31	6	Advanced to Final round
2	Finland	3	2	0	1	14	6	+8	4	Advanced to Final round
3	Russia	3	1	0	2	8	24	−16	2	Sent to Consolation round
4	Germany	3	0	0	3	4	27	−23	0	Sent to Consolation round

Source: IIHF

==== Results ====
All times local

April 3, 2000; 4:00 pm	Finland	7 – 1	Russia	Hershey Centre

April 3, 2000; 8:00 pm	Germany	1 – 16	United States	Barrie Molson Centre

April 4, 2000; 4:00 pm	Finland	4 – 1	Germany	Hershey Centre

April 4, 2000; 8:00 pm	United States	15 – 0	Russia	Hershey Centre

April 6, 2000; 7:00 pm	Russia	7 – 2	Germany	Civic Centre

April 6, 2000; 7:00 pm	United States	4 – 3	Finland	Thompson

== Playoff round ==
=== Consolation round 5–8 place ===
April 7, 2000; 4:00 pm	China	3 – 0	Germany	Hershey Centre

April 7, 2000; 7:30 pm	Japan	4 – 8	Russia	Hershey Centre

=== Consolation round 7–8 place ===
April 9, 2000; 12:00 pm	Germany	3 – 2	Japan	Iceland

=== Consolation round 5–6 place ===
April 9, 2000; 12:00 pm	Russia	4 – 0	China	Hershey Centre

=== Final round ===
Semi finals 8 April 2000
A1	Canada	3
B2	Finland	2
B1	United States	7
A2	Sweden	1

Finals; 9 April 2000
Canada	3
United States	2
Bronze Medal Game
Finland	7
Sweden	1

=== Semifinals ===
April 8, 2000; 1:00 pm	Canada	3 – 2	Finland	Hershey Centre

April 8, 2000; 7:00 pm	United States	7 – 1	Sweden	Hershey Centre

=== Match for third place ===
April 9, 2000; 4:00 pm	Finland	7 – 1	Sweden	Hershey Centre

=== Final ===
April 9, 2000; 7:30 pm	Canada	3 – 2 AOT	United States	Hershey Centre

== Champions ==
2000 IIHF World Women Championship winners

Canada
6th title

== Scoring leaders ==
Player	GP	G	A	Pts	PIM	+/-
(United States) Krissy Wendell	5	2	11	13	6	10
(United States) Stephanie O'Sullivan	5	5	7	12	2	12
(United States) Karyn Bye	5	8	2	10	2	12
(United States) Alana Blahoski	5	7	2	9	0	7
(Canada) Jayna Hefford	5	5	3	8	4	5
(United States) Brandy Fisher	5	3	5	8	0	5
(United States) Natalie Darwitz	5	2	6	8	18	10
(United States) A.J. Mleczko	5	1	7	8	2	15
(Canada) Hayley Wickenheiser	5	1	7	8	4	8
(Finland) Katja Riipi	5	7	0	7	0	5

== Goaltending leaders ==
Player	Mins	GA	GAA	SV%
(Canada) Sami Jo Small	150:02	2	0.80	95.65
(United States) Sarah Tueting	120:00	1	0.50	94.44
(China) Guo Hong	220:00	6	1.64	94.06
(Canada) Kim St-Pierre	149:58	3	1.20	93.48
(Finland) Tuula Puputti	238:23	9	2.27	92.56

== Final standings ==
Rk.	Team	Notes
1st place, gold medalist(s)	Canada	Qualified for 2002 Winter Olympic Games
2nd place, silver medalist(s)	United States	Qualified for 2002 Winter Olympic Games
3rd place, bronze medalist(s)	Finland	Qualified for 2002 Winter Olympic Games
4.	Sweden	Qualified for 2002 Winter Olympic Games
5.	Russia	Qualified for 2002 Winter Olympic Games
6.	China	Qualified for 2002 Winter Olympic Games
7.	Germany	Qualified for 2002 Winter Olympic Games Qualification
8.	Japan	Relegated to the 2001 World Championships Division I Qualified for 2002 Winter Olympic Games Qualification

== World Championship Group B ==
World Championship Group B was played again with an eight team tournament which was hosted by Latvia in Liepāja and Riga. Kazakhstan won the tournament winning the final stage round robin by 3 points to win the competition and to ensure their Promotion to the main World Championship in 2001.

== Directorate Awards ==
- Goalie: Sami Jo Small, (Canada)
- Defender: Angela Ruggiero, (United States)
- Forward: Katja Riipi, (Finland)
