= Russia women's national ice hockey team =

Russia
- Nickname: Большая красная машина (The Big Red Machine)
- Association: Ice Hockey Federation of Russia
- General manager: Vladislav Prodan
- Head coach: Yevgeni Bobariko
- Assistants: Denis Afinogenov; Mikhail Vorobyov
- Captain: Olga Sosina
- Team colors
- IIHF code: RUS
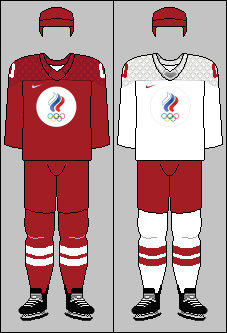

Ranking
- Current IIHF: 6 (21 April 2025)
- Highest IIHF: 4 (first in 2013)
- Lowest IIHF: 6 (first in 2005)

First international
- Switzerland 2–1 Russia (Brampton, Canada; 1 April 1994)

Biggest defeat
- United States 15–0 Russia (Mississauga, Canada; 4 April 2000)

Olympics
- Appearances: 6 (first in 2002)

World Championships
- Appearances: 17 (first in 1997)
- Best result: Bronze: (2001, 2013, 2016)

European Championships
- Appearances: 2 (first in 1995)
- Best result: Silver: (1996)

International record (W–L–T)
- 103–130–7

Russia women's national ice hockey team
Medal record

World Championships
Bronze medal – third place	2001 United States	
Bronze medal – third place	2013 Canada	
Bronze medal – third place	2016 Canada	

European Championships
Silver medal – second place	1996 Russia	

The Russian women's national ice hockey team represents Russia at the International Ice Hockey Federation's IIHF World Women's Championships. The women's national team is controlled by the Ice Hockey Federation of Russia. After the 2022 Russian invasion of Ukraine, the International Ice Hockey Federation suspended Russia from all levels of competition.

== History ==
On 1 April 1994, Russia played its first game in Brampton, Canada, losing 1–2 to Switzerland. Three times – at 2001 Women's World Ice Hockey Championships, the 2013 IIHF Women's World Championship and the 2016 IIHF Women's World Championship Russia reached 3rd place by defeating Finland in the bronze medal game.

After the Russian invasion of Ukraine, the International Ice Hockey Federation suspended Russia from all levels of competition.

== Tournament record ==
=== Olympic Games ===
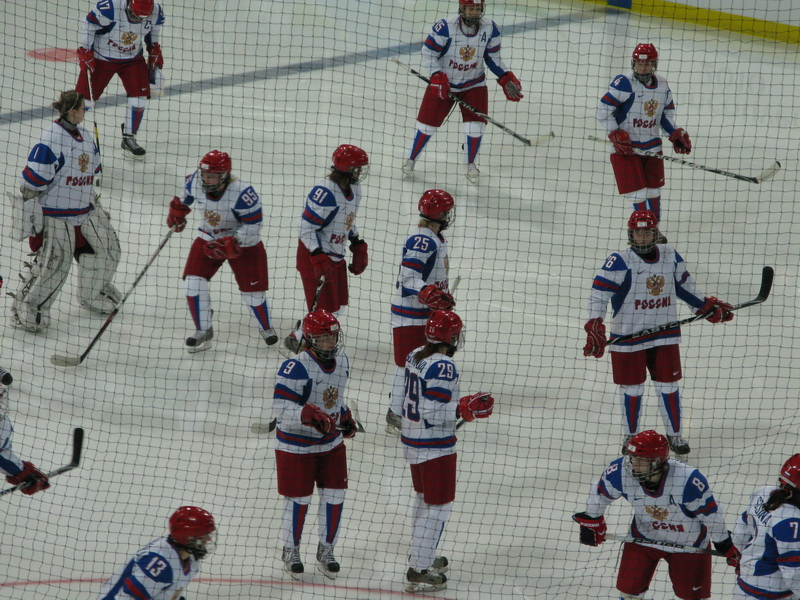
The Russian women warming up before the game against China at the 2010 Winter Olympics.

- 2002 – Finished in 5th place
- 2006 – Finished in 6th place
- 2010 – Finished in 6th place
- 2014 – Finished in 6th place, disqualified
- 2018 – Finished in 4th place (As Olympic Athletes from Russia women's national ice hockey team)
- 2022 – Finished in 5th place (As ROC women's national ice hockey team)

=== World Championship ===
- 1997 – Finished in 6th place
- 1999 – Finished in 6th place
- 2000 – Finished in 5th place
- 2001 – Won bronze medal
- 2004 – Finished in 5th place
- 2005 – Finished in 8th place
- 2007 – Finished in 7th place
- 2008 – Finished in 6th place
- 2009 – Finished in 5th place
- 2011 – Finished in 4th place
- 2012 – Finished in 6th place
- 2013 – Won bronze medal
- 2015 – Finished in 4th place
- 2016 – Won bronze medal
- 2017 – Finished in 5th place
- 2019 – Finished in 4th place
- 2020 – Cancelled due to the coronavirus pandemic
- 2021 – Finished in 5th place (As ROC women's national ice hockey team)
- 2022 – Expelled due to the Russian invasion of Ukraine
- 2023 – Expelled due to the Russian invasion of Ukraine
- 2024 – Expelled due to the Russian invasion of Ukraine
- 2025 – Expelled due to the Russian invasion of Ukraine
- 2026 – Expelled due to the Russian invasion of Ukraine

=== European Championship ===
- 1995 – Finished in 7th place (won Pool B)
- 1996 – Won silver medal

== Team ==
=== Current roster ===
A 23-player roster playing for the ROC was announced on 24 January 2022. The roster submitted in the ROC’s preliminary application on 2 February featured only nineteen players. Due to positive COVID-19 test results, previously named goaltender Diana Farkhutdinova, defencemen Angelina Goncharenko and Yekaterina Nikolayeva, and forwards Lyudmila Belyakova and captain Olga Sosina were removed and reserve forward Polina Luchnikova was added to the roster. Goaltender Valeria Merkusheva and defenceman Maria Batalova were expected join the team in Beijing on 3 February. On 3 February, defenceman Yulia Smirnova and forward Landysh Falyakhova were registered and, on 5 February, Maria Batalova was registered and both Angelina Goncharenko and Olga Sosina returned to the official roster.

Head coach: Yevgeni Bobariko

No.	Pos.	Name	Height	Weight	Birthdate	Team
2	D	Angelina Goncharenko	1.77 m (5 ft 10 in)	70 kg (150 lb)	23 May 1994 (aged 27)	(Russia) SKIF Nizhny Novgorod
4	D	Yulia Smirnova	1.63 m (5 ft 4 in)	55 kg (121 lb)	8 May 1998 (aged 23)	(Russia) Dynamo-Neva St. Petersburg
12	D	Maria Pechnikova	1.78 m (5 ft 10 in)	60 kg (130 lb)	8 June 1992 (aged 29)	(Russia) Agidel Ufa
13	D	Nina Pirogova	1.73 m (5 ft 8 in)	60 kg (130 lb)	26 January 1999 (aged 23)	(Russia) HC Tornado
15	F	Valeria Pavlova	1.78 m (5 ft 10 in)	78 kg (172 lb)	15 April 1995 (aged 26)	(Russia) Biryusa Krasnoyarsk
17	F	Fanuza Kadirova	1.61 m (5 ft 3 in)	59 kg (130 lb)	6 April 1998 (aged 23)	(Russia) Dynamo-Neva St. Petersburg
18	F	Olga Sosina – C	1.63 m (5 ft 4 in)	77 kg (170 lb)	27 July 1992 (aged 29)	(Russia) Agidel Ufa
19	D	Yelena Provorova	1.65 m (5 ft 5 in)	63 kg (139 lb)	22 November 2001 (aged 20)	(Russia) SKIF Nizhny Novgorod
21	F	Polina Bolgareva	1.67 m (5 ft 6 in)	65 kg (143 lb)	6 February 1999 (aged 22)	(Russia) Dynamo-Neva St. Petersburg
22	D	Maria Batalova	1.73 m (5 ft 8 in)	65 kg (143 lb)	3 May 1996 (aged 25)	(Russia) Agidel Ufa
23	G	Daria Gredzen	1.76 m (5 ft 9 in)	68 kg (150 lb)	23 March 2004 (aged 17)	(Russia) Biryusa Krasnoyarsk
26	F	Yekaterina Dobrodeyeva	1.59 m (5 ft 3 in)	58 kg (128 lb)	10 December 1999 (aged 22)	(Russia) Biryusa Krasnoyarsk
27	F	Veronika Korzhakova	1.68 m (5 ft 6 in)	62 kg (137 lb)	9 June 2003 (aged 18)	(Russia) Agidel Ufa
29	F	Alexandra Vafina	1.64 m (5 ft 5 in)	57 kg (126 lb)	28 July 1990 (age 36)	(Russia) Dynamo-Neva St. Petersburg
42	F	Oxana Bratisheva	1.65 m (5 ft 5 in)	54 kg (119 lb)	5 June 2000 (aged 21)	(Russia) SKIF Nizhny Novgorod
59	F	Yelena Dergachyova	1.58 m (5 ft 2 in)	54 kg (119 lb)	8 November 1995 (aged 26)	(Russia) HC Tornado
69	G	Maria Sorokina	1.66 m (5 ft 5 in)	65 kg (143 lb)	19 August 1995 (aged 26)	(Russia) Agidel Ufa
70	D	Anna Shibanova	1.62 m (5 ft 4 in)	63 kg (139 lb)	10 November 1994 (aged 27)	(Russia) Agidel Ufa
72	D	Anna Savonina	1.65 m (5 ft 5 in)	65 kg (143 lb)	5 December 2001 (aged 20)	(Russia) HC Tornado
73	F	Viktoria Kulishova	1.71 m (5 ft 7 in)	62 kg (137 lb)	12 August 1999 (aged 22)	(Russia) SKIF Nizhny Novgorod
79	F	Landysh Falyakhova	1.58 m (5 ft 2 in)	54 kg (119 lb)	31 August 1999 (aged 22)	(Russia) SKIF Nizhny Novgorod
87	F	Polina Luchnikova	1.67 m (5 ft 6 in)	68 kg (150 lb)	30 January 2002 (aged 20)	(Russia) Agidel Ufa
97	F	Anna Shokhina	1.68 m (5 ft 6 in)	67 kg (148 lb)	23 June 1997 (aged 24)	(Russia) HC Tornado

=== Notable players ===
- Yekaterina Smolentseva
- Iya Gavrilova
