= Italy at the 2006 Winter Olympics =

- IOC code: ITA
- NOC: Italian National Olympic Committee
- Website: www.coni.it (in Italian)

in Turin
- Competitors: 185 (111 men, 74 women) in 15 sports
- Flag bearers: Carolina Kostner (opening); Armin Zöggeler (closing)
- Medals Ranked 9th: Gold 5 Silver 0 Bronze 6 Total 11

Winter Olympics appearances (overview)
- 1924; 1928; 1932; 1936; 1948; 1952; 1956; 1960; 1964; 1968; 1972; 1976; 1980; 1984; 1988; 1992; 1994; 1998; 2002; 2006; 2010; 2014; 2018; 2022; 2026

Italy was the host nation for the 2006 Winter Olympics in Turin. It was the second time that Italy had hosted the Winter Games (after the 1956 Winter Olympics in Cortina d'Ampezzo) and the third time overall (after the 1960 Summer Olympics in Rome). Italy's flag bearer for the opening ceremony was figure skater Carolina Kostner. Kostner's cousin, Isolde Kostner, was Italy's flag bearer at the 2002 Winter Olympics.

== Medalists ==
Medal	Name	Sport	Event	Date
Gold	Armin Zöggeler	Luge	Men's singles	12 February
Gold	Matteo Anesi; Stefano Donagrandi; Enrico Fabris; Ippolito Sanfratello	Speed skating	Men's team pursuit	16 February
Gold	Fulvio Valbusa; Giorgio Di Centa; Pietro Piller Cottrer; Cristian Zorzi	Cross-country skiing	Men's 4 x 10 km relay	19 February
Gold	Enrico Fabris	Speed skating	Men's 1500 m	21 February
Gold	Giorgio Di Centa	Cross-country skiing	Men's 50 km freestyle	26 February
Bronze	Enrico Fabris	Speed skating	Men's 5000 m	11 February
Bronze	Pietro Piller Cottrer	Cross-country skiing	Men's 30 km pursuit	12 February
Bronze	Gerhard Plankensteiner; Oswald Haselrieder	Luge	Doubles	15 February
Bronze	Arianna Follis; Gabriella Paruzzi; Antonella Confortola; Sabina Valbusa	Cross-country skiing	Women's 4 x 5 km relay	18 February
Bronze	Gerda Weissensteiner; Jennifer Isacco	Bobsleigh	Two-woman	21 February
Bronze	Marta Capurso; Mara Zini; Arianna Fontana; Katia Zini	Short track speed skating	Women's 3000 m relay	22 February

== Host ==
Italy were hosting the Winter Olympics for the second time. The 1956 Winter Olympics were held in Cortina d'Ampezzo. Cortina d'Ampezzo had also been awarded the 1944 Winter Olympics which were cancelled due to World War II.

== Alpine skiing ==
Men

Athlete	Event	Final				
Athlete	Event	Run 1	Run 2	Run 3	Total	Rank
Massimiliano Blardone	Super-G	n/a			1:33.48	29
Massimiliano Blardone	Giant slalom	1:17.21	1:19.74	n/a	2:36.95	11
Peter Fill	Downhill	n/a			1:50.88	19
Peter Fill	Super-G	n/a			1:31.54	13
Peter Fill	Combined	1:39.22	47.46	45.43	3:12.21	9
Kristian Ghedina	Downhill	n/a			1:50.98	23
Manfred Mölgg	Giant slalom	did not finish				
Manfred Mölgg	Slalom	did not finish				
Giorgio Rocca	Slalom	did not finish				
Giorgio Rocca	Combined	1:41.39	44.88	44.47	3:10.74	5
Alberto Schieppati	Giant slalom	1:18.21	1:19.62	n/a	2:37.83	15
Hannes Paul Schmid	Slalom	55.26	1:13.37	n/a	2:08.63	39
Davide Simoncelli	Giant slalom	did not finish				
Patrick Staudacher	Downhill	n/a			1:50.29	9
Patrick Staudacher	Super-G	n/a			1:31.91	17
Patrick Staudacher	Combined	1:40.52	did not finish			
Kurt Sulzenbacher	Downhill	n/a			1:50.84	18
Patrick Thaler	Slalom	did not finish				

Women

Athlete	Event	Final				
Athlete	Event	Run 1	Run 2	Run 3	Total	Rank
Daniela Ceccarelli	Super-G	n/a			1:35.26	31
Annalisa Ceresa	Slalom	44.55	48.22	n/a	1:32.77	24
Chiara Costazza	Slalom	44.15	46.93	n/a	1:31.08	8
Elena Fanchini	Downhill	n/a			2:01.06	29
Elena Fanchini	Super-G	did not finish				
Nadia Fanchini	Downhill	n/a			1:57.84	10
Nadia Fanchini	Super-G	n/a			1:36.46	38
Nadia Fanchini	Giant slalom	1:01.77	1:09.69	n/a	2:11.46	8
Nadia Fanchini	Combined	40.90	46.21	1:30.04	2:57.15	20
Denise Karbon	Giant slalom	1:02.90	did not finish			
Daniela Merighetti	Downhill	n/a			2:01.76	32
Daniela Merighetti	Slalom	did not finish				
Daniela Merighetti	Combined	41.41	disqualified			
Manuela Mölgg	Giant slalom	did not finish				
Manuela Mölgg	Slalom	43.59	48.58	1:32.17	n/a	19
Karen Putzer	Giant slalom	1:02.46	1:10.01	2:12.47	n/a	14
Lucia Recchia	Downhill	n/a			1:58.30	13
Lucia Recchia	Super-G	n/a			1:33.48	8
Wendy Siorpaes	Combined	42.66	48.48	1:31.71	3:02.85	27

Note: In the men's combined, run 1 is the downhill, and runs 2 and 3 are the slalom. In the women's combined, run 1 and 2 are the slalom, and run 3 the downhill.

== Biathlon ==
Men

Athlete	Event	Final		
Athlete	Event	Time	Misses	Rank
Sergio Bonaldi	Sprint	30:06.7	3	67
Paolo Longo	Individual	1:01:27.9	5	55
Christian de Lorenzi	Sprint	28:14.5	2	27
Christian de Lorenzi	Pursuit	37:28.53	4	14
Christian de Lorenzi	Mass start	49:59.6	4	26
Christian de Lorenzi	Individual	56:04.0	1	7
Wilfried Pallhuber	Sprint	28:05.6	1	22
Wilfried Pallhuber	Pursuit	37:30.36	3	17
Wilfried Pallhuber	Mass start	49:41.5	2	24
Wilfried Pallhuber	Individual	56:08.4	1	9
Rene Laurent Vuillermoz	Sprint	28:46.7	4	40
Rene Laurent Vuillermoz	Pursuit	37:27.33	6	13
Rene Laurent Vuillermoz	Mass start	49:53.1	4	25
Rene Laurent Vuillermoz	Individual	58:17.9	4	25
Christian de Lorenzi; Rene Laurent Vuillermoz; Paolo Longo; Wilfried Pallhuber	Relay	1:23:40.9	12	8

Women

Athlete	Event	Final		
Athlete	Event	Time	Misses	Rank
Barbara Ertl	Individual	55:30.0	2	38
Katja Haller	Sprint	25:22.6	1	53
Katja Haller	Pursuit	did not finish		
Michela Ponza	Sprint	23:27.2	1	13
Michela Ponza	Pursuit	38:51.79	2	5
Michela Ponza	Mass start	42:21.6	1	11
Michela Ponza	Individual	53:01.4	2	17
Nathalie Santer	Sprint	24:09.5	2	26
Nathalie Santer	Pursuit	43:31.68	10	38
Nathalie Santer	Individual	57:08.4	6	52
Saskia Santer	Sprint	25:42.6	3	57
Saskia Santer	Pursuit	Lapped		
Saskia Santer	Individual	56:52.1	6	51
Michela Ponza; Saskia Santer; Nathalie Santer; Barbara Ertl	Relay	1:22:42.7	12	12

== Bobsleigh ==
Athlete	Event	Final					
Athlete	Event	Run 1	Run 2	Run 3	Run 4	Total	Rank
Simone Bertazzo; Matteo Torchio	Two-man	55.78	55.99	56.43	56.95	3:45.15	9
Fabrizio Tosini; Samuele Romanini	Two-man	56.06	56.02	56.93	57.10	3:46.11	13
Gerda Weissensteiner; Jennifer Isacco	Two-woman	57.50	57.67	57.71	58.13	3:51.01	Bronze medal
Jessica Gillarduzzi; Fabiana Mollica	Two-woman	58.26	57.77	58.38	58.55	3:52.96	12
Simone Bertazzo; Samuele Romanini; Matteo Torchio; Omar Sacco	Four-man	55.63	56.13	55.46	55.62	3:42.84	12
Fabrizio Tosini; Luca Ottolino; Antonio De Sanctis; Giorgio Morbidelli	Four-man	55.80	55.73	55.57	55.51	3:42.61	11

== Cross-country skiing ==
Distance

Men

Athlete	Event	Final	
Athlete	Event	Total	Rank
Valerio Checchi	15 km classical	41:01.5	38
Valerio Checchi	30 km pursuit	1:17:37.8	19
Giorgio Di Centa	30 km pursuit	1:17:03.2	4
Giorgio Di Centa	50 km freestyle	2:06:11.8	Gold medal
Pietro Piller Cottrer	30 km pursuit	1:17:01.7	Bronze medal
Pietro Piller Cottrer	50 km freestyle	2:06:14.0	5
Fabio Santus	15 km classical	40:47.0	33
Fabio Santus	30 km pursuit	1:17:25.5	16
Fabio Santus	50 km freestyle	2:06:38.2	19
Cristian Saracco	15 km classical	41:12.0	40
Fulvio Valbusa	15 km classical	39:18.8	12
Fulvio Valbusa	50 km freestyle	2:07:22.5	30
Fulvio Valbusa; Giorgio Di Centa; Pietro Piller Cottrer; Cristian Zorzi	4 x 10 km relay	1:43:45.7	Gold medal

Women

Athlete	Event	Final	
Athlete	Event	Total	Rank
Antonella Confortola	10 km classical	30:26.9	34
Antonella Confortola	15 km pursuit	45:11.9	22
Antonella Confortola	30 km freestyle	Did not finish	
Arianna Follis	15 km pursuit	46:40.9	36
Arianna Follis	30 km freestyle	1:24:46.1	12
Magda Genuin	10 km classical	31:37.8	48
Cristina Paluselli	10 km classical	30:46.0	39
Gabriella Paruzzi	10 km classical	29:24.0	13
Gabriella Paruzzi	15 km pursuit	43:18.9	5
Gabriella Paruzzi	30 km freestyle	1:23:00.8	5
Sabina Valbusa	15 km pursuit	44:44.7	17
Sabina Valbusa	30 km freestyle	1:23:37.6	10
Arianna Follis; Gabriella Paruzzi; Antonella Confortola; Sabina Valbusa	4 x 5 km relay	54:58.7	Bronze medal

Sprint

Athlete	Event	Qualifying		Quarterfinal		Semifinal		Final	
Athlete	Event	Total	Rank	Total	Rank	Total	Rank	Total	Rank
Arianna Follis	Women's sprint	2:12.90	2 Q	2:14.7	2 Q	2:16.2	3	Final B 2:20.3	7
Loris Frasnelli	Men's sprint	2:16.30	8 Q	2:20.4	2 Q	2:26.8	3	Final B 2:25.2	6
Magda Genuin	Women's sprint	2:16.41	18 Q	2:17.9	4	Did not advance			19
Barbara Moriggl	Women's sprint	2:19.12	33	Did not advance					33
Renato Pasini	Men's sprint	2:16.87	11 Q	2:23.7	4	Did not advance			18
Freddy Schwienbacher	Men's sprint	2:18.59	17 Q	2:20.4	1 Q	2:22.8	3	Final B 2:23.9	5
Cristian Zorzi	Men's sprint	2:16.23	5 Q	2:25.9	1 Q	2:26.1	2 Q	2:31.7	4
Freddy Schwienbacher; Giorgio Di Centa	Men's team sprint	n/a				17:26.2	4 Q	17:31.3	9
Arianna Follis; Gabriella Paruzzi	Women's team sprint	n/a				17:32.6	3 Q	17:24.8	7

== Curling ==
=== Men's tournament ===
Team: Joël Retornaz (skip), Fabio Alvera, Gian Paolo Zandegiacomo , Antonio Menardi, Marco Mariani (alternate)

Round robin
Draw 1

Team	1	2	3	4	5	6	7	8	9	10	Final
Italy (Retornaz)	1	0	2	0	1	0	1	0	0	0	5
Great Britain (Murdoch)	0	3	0	2	0	1	0	0	0	1	7

;Draw 2

Team	1	2	3	4	5	6	7	8	9	10	Final
Italy (Retornaz)	0	0	1	0	0	1	0	2	0	1	5
Sweden (Lindholm)	0	2	0	1	0	0	2	0	2	0	7

;Draw 3

Team	1	2	3	4	5	6	7	8	9	10	11	Final
Germany (Kapp)	0	1	2	0	1	0	0	4	0	0	0	8
Italy (Retornaz)	1	0	0	2	0	2	0	0	2	1	1	9

;Draw 5

Team	1	2	3	4	5	6	7	8	9	10	Final
United States (Fenson)	0	0	0	0	2	0	2	0	0	1	5
Italy (Retornaz)	0	0	1	1	0	2	0	1	1	0	6

;Draw 7

Team	1	2	3	4	5	6	7	8	9	10	Final
Italy (Retornaz)	0	0	2	0	1	0	0	X	X	X	3
Norway (Trulsen)	0	2	0	4	0	1	4	X	X	X	11

;Draw 8

Team	1	2	3	4	5	6	7	8	9	10	11	Final
New Zealand (Becker)	0	1	0	1	0	0	1	0	1	1	0	5
Italy (Retornaz)	0	0	2	0	2	0	0	1	0	0	1	6

;Draw 9

Team	1	2	3	4	5	6	7	8	9	10	11	Final
Canada (Gushue)	0	0	1	0	0	1	1	0	2	1	0	6
Italy (Retornaz)	2	1	0	1	1	0	0	1	0	0	1	7

;Draw 10

Team	1	2	3	4	5	6	7	8	9	10	Final
Italy (Retornaz)	0	1	0	1	1	0	1	0	0	0	4
Finland (Uusipaavalniemi)	1	0	2	0	0	2	0	0	1	1	7

;Draw 12

Team	1	2	3	4	5	6	7	8	9	10	Final
Switzerland (Stöckli)	4	0	1	0	3	2	X	X	X	X	10
Italy (Retornaz)	0	1	0	1	0	0	X	X	X	X	2

Standings

Rank	Team	Skip	Won	Lost
1	Finland	Markku Uusipaavalniemi	7	2
2	Canada	Brad Gushue	6	3
3	United States	Pete Fenson	6	3
4	Great Britain	David Murdoch	6	3
5	Norway	Pål Trulsen	5	4
6	Switzerland	Ralph Stockli	5	4
7	Italy	Joel Retornaz	4	5
8	Sweden	Peter Lindholm	3	6
9	Germany	Andy Kapp	3	6
10	New Zealand	Sean Becker	0	9

=== Women's tournament ===
Team: Diana Gaspari (skip), Giulia Lacedelli, Rosa Pompanin, Violetta Caldart, Eleonora Alvera (alternate)

Round robin
Draw 1

Team	1	2	3	4	5	6	7	8	9	10	Final
Switzerland (Ott)	0	0	4	0	2	0	3	2	X	X	11
Italy (Gaspari)	1	0	0	2	0	1	0	0	X	X	4

;Draw 3

Team	1	2	3	4	5	6	7	8	9	10	Final
Italy (Gaspari)	0	3	0	1	0	2	0	1	0	0	7
Denmark (Holm)	1	0	1	0	4	0	3	0	1	0	10

;Draw 4

Team	1	2	3	4	5	6	7	8	9	10	Final
Italy (Gaspari)	1	0	1	0	1	0	1	0	0	2	6
Russia (Privivkova)	0	1	0	1	0	1	0	0	1	0	4

;Draw 5

Team	1	2	3	4	5	6	7	8	9	10	Final
Sweden (Norberg)	0	0	2	0	3	0	1	0	1	1	8
Italy (Gaspari)	0	1	0	1	0	1	0	1	0	0	4

;Draw 7

Team	1	2	3	4	5	6	7	8	9	10	11	Final
Norway (Nordby)	1	0	1	0	2	0	0	2	0	1	2	9
Italy (Gaspari)	0	2	0	1	0	1	2	0	1	0	0	7

;Draw 8

Team	1	2	3	4	5	6	7	8	9	10	Final
Great Britain (Martin)	0	0	2	0	2	0	2	0	2	1	9
Italy (Gaspari)	0	1	0	2	0	1	0	1	0	0	5

;Draw 9

Team	1	2	3	4	5	6	7	8	9	10	Final
Italy (Gaspari)	0	0	0	0	3	0	X	X	X	X	3
United States (Johnson)	0	2	3	2	0	4	X	X	X	X	11

;Draw 10

Team	1	2	3	4	5	6	7	8	9	10	Final
Italy (Gaspari)	0	0	0	2	0	1	1	0	0	X	4
Canada (Kleibrink)	1	2	2	0	2	0	0	2	2	X	11

;Draw 11

Team	1	2	3	4	5	6	7	8	9	10	Final
Italy (Gaspari)	1	0	0	1	0	1	1	0	0	0	4
Japan (Onodera)	0	1	0	0	1	0	0	2	0	2	6

Standings

Rank	Team	Skip	Won	Lost
1	Sweden	Anette Norberg	7	2
2	Switzerland	Mirjam Ott	7	2
3	Canada	Shannon Kleibrink	6	3
4	Norway	Dordi Nordby	6	3
5	Great Britain	Rhona Martin	5	4
6	Russia	Ludmila Privivkova	5	4
7	Japan	Ayumi Onodera	4	5
8	Denmark	Dorthe Holm	2	7
9	United States	Cassandra Johnson	2	7
10	Italy	Diana Gaspari	1	8

Key: The hammer indicates which team had the last stone in the first end.

== Figure skating ==
Athlete	Event	CD		SP/OD		FS/FD		Total	
Athlete	Event	Points	Rank	Points	Rank	Points	Rank	Points	Rank
Silvia Fontana	Ladies'	n/a		42.47	23 Q	77.90	22	120.37	22
Carolina Kostner	Ladies'	n/a		53.77	11 Q	99.73	9	153.50	9
Karel Zelenka	Men's	n/a		53.46	25	did not advance			25
Federica Faiella; Massimo Scali	Ice dance	33.20	10	43.25	21	87.92	10	164.37	13
Barbara Fusar-Poli; Maurizio Margaglio	Ice dance	38.78	1	51.73	10	92.95	8	183.46	6

Key: CD = Compulsory Dance, FD = Free Dance, FS = Free Skate, OD = Original Dance, SP = Short Program

== Freestyle skiing ==
Athlete	Event	Qualifying		Final	
Athlete	Event	Points	Rank	Points	Rank
Walter Bormolini	Men's moguls	22.87	18 Q	21.36	18
Claudio Bosia	Men's moguls	19.62	31	did not advance	31
Simone Galli	Men's moguls	21.98	21	did not advance	21
Mariangela Parravicini	Women's moguls	19.62	23	did not advance	23
Mattia Pegorari	Men's moguls	16.25	34	did not advance	34
Deborah Scanzio	Women's moguls	22.72	13 Q	23.00	9

== Ice hockey ==
=== Men's tournament ===
Players

The following is the Italian roster for the men's ice hockey tournament at the 2006 Winter Olympics.

Head coach: (Canada) Michel Goulet

Assistant coaches: (Canada) Ron Ivany, Fabio Polloni

No.	Pos.	Name	Height	Weight	Birthdate	Team
2	F	Stefan Zisser	5 ft 7 in (170 cm)	185 lb (84 kg)	March 6, 1980 (aged 25)	(Italy) HC Bolzano
3	D	Carter Trevisani	6 ft 1 in (185 cm)	198 lb (90 kg)	June 15, 1982 (aged 23)	(Italy) Asiago
6	D	Michele Strazzabosco (A)	6 ft 4 in (193 cm)	223 lb (101 kg)	February 6, 1976 (aged 30)	(Italy) Milano
7	D	Bob Nardella	5 ft 8 in (173 cm)	170 lb (77 kg)	February 2, 1968 (aged 38)	(United States) Rockford IceHogs
8	D	Florian Ramoser	6 ft 2 in (188 cm)	198 lb (90 kg)	October 7, 1979 (aged 26)	(Italy) HC Bolzano
9	F	Giorgio De Bettin	5 ft 9 in (175 cm)	185 lb (84 kg)	August 7, 1972 (aged 33)	(Italy) Cortina
10	F	Giulio Scandella	6 ft 0 in (183 cm)	183 lb (83 kg)	September 18, 1983 (aged 22)	(Italy) Asiago
11	D	Andrè Signoretti	5 ft 9 in (175 cm)	190 lb (86 kg)	January 16, 1979 (aged 27)	(Italy) Cortina
14	D	Carlo Lorenzi	5 ft 10 in (178 cm)	170 lb (77 kg)	September 2, 1974 (aged 31)	(Italy) Alleghe
16	F	John Parco	6 ft 0 in (183 cm)	192 lb (87 kg)	August 25, 1971 (aged 34)	(Italy) Asiago
17	F	Anthony Iob	6 ft 0 in (183 cm)	205 lb (93 kg)	January 2, 1971 (aged 35)	(Austria) EC KAC
21	F	Giuseppe Busillo (C)	6 ft 5 in (196 cm)	212 lb (96 kg)	May 13, 1970 (aged 35)	(Italy) Milano
22	F	Stefano Margoni	6 ft 0 in (183 cm)	181 lb (82 kg)	May 12, 1975 (aged 30)	(Italy) HC Bolzano
24	F	Mario Chitaroni (A)	5 ft 7 in (170 cm)	176 lb (80 kg)	June 11, 1967 (aged 38)	(Italy) Milano
26	D	Armin Helfer	6 ft 2 in (188 cm)	218 lb (99 kg)	May 31, 1980 (aged 25)	(Italy) Milano
27	F	Lucio Topatigh	6 ft 1 in (185 cm)	203 lb (92 kg)	October 19, 1965 (aged 40)	(Italy) Asiago
28	F/D	Manuel De Toni	5 ft 11 in (180 cm)	192 lb (87 kg)	January 10, 1979 (aged 27)	(Italy) Alleghe
29	G	Jason Muzzatti	6 ft 0 in (183 cm)	190 lb (86 kg)	February 3, 1970 (aged 36)	(Italy) HC Bolzano
33	F	Tony Tuzzolino	6 ft 2 in (188 cm)	201 lb (91 kg)	October 9, 1975 (aged 30)	(Sweden) MODO Hockey
34	F	Jason Cirone	5 ft 11 in (180 cm)	209 lb (95 kg)	February 21, 1971 (aged 34)	(Italy) Asiago
50	D	Christian Borgatello	5 ft 9 in (175 cm)	181 lb (82 kg)	February 10, 1982 (aged 24)	(Italy) Milano
71	F	Luca Ansoldi	6 ft 0 in (183 cm)	196 lb (89 kg)	January 5, 1982 (aged 24)	(Italy) Ritten/Renon
73	G	Günther Hell	5 ft 9 in (175 cm)	176 lb (80 kg)	August 30, 1978 (aged 27)	(Italy) HC Bolzano
85	G	René Baur	5 ft 11 in (180 cm)	176 lb (80 kg)	January 19, 1985 (aged 21)	(Italy) Pustertal/Val Pusteria
19	F	Nicola Fontanive	5 ft 6 in (168 cm)	163 lb (74 kg)	October 25, 1985 (aged 20)	(Italy) Alleghe

Round-robin

Pos	Team	Pld	W	D	L	GF	GA	GD	Pts	Qualification
1	Finland	5	5	0	0	19	2	+17	10	Quarterfinals
2	Switzerland	5	2	2	1	10	12	−2	6	Quarterfinals
3	Canada	5	3	0	2	15	9	+6	6	Quarterfinals
4	Czech Republic	5	2	0	3	14	12	+2	4	Quarterfinals
5	Germany	5	0	2	3	7	16	−9	2	
6	Italy (H)	5	0	2	3	9	23	−14	2	

Source: IIHF
(H) Hosts

15 February 2006; 13:05	Italy	2–7 (0–1, 2–5, 0–1)	Canada	Palasport Olimpico, Turin; Attendance: 8,575

Game reference

Jason Muzzatti
Goalies
Martin Brodeur
Referee:
(Sweden) Thomas Andersson
Linesmen:
(Slovakia) Miroslav Halecký
(Russia) Sergei Shelyanin

	0–1	5:33 – J. Iginla (T. Bertuzzi, J. Sakic) (PP)
J. Cirone (G. Scandella) (PP) – 20:43	1–1
	1–2	21:55 – D. Heatley (M. St. Louis, V. Lecavalier)
	1–3	25:38 – S. Doan (C. Pronger, B. Richards)
	1–4	26:04 – J. Iginla (J. Sakic) (PP)
	1–5	33:53 – M. St. Louis (D. Heatley, V. Lecavalier)
	1–6	34:38 – B. Richards (S. Doan, T. Bertuzzi)
J. Parco (T. Tuzzolino) – 38:08	2–6
	2–7	43:39 – J. Thornton (S. Gagné) (PP)

20 min
Penalties
12 min
20
Shots
50

16 February 2006; 12:05	Finland	6–0 (0–0, 4–0, 2–0)	Italy	Palasport Olimpico, Turin; Attendance: 7,776

Game reference

Fredrik Norrena
Goalies
Günther Hell
Referee:
(Russia) Vyacheslav Bulanov
Linesmen:
(Slovakia) Milan Mášik
(United States) Kevin Redding

J. Lehtinen (T. Numminen) (PP) – 21:49	1–0
S. Koivu (T. Numminen) (PP) – 23:51	2–0
J. Jokinen (P. Nummelin, S. Salo) (PP) – 30:11	3–0
V. Peltonen (P. Nummelin) (PP) – 38:25	4–0
T. Selänne (S. Koivu, S. Salo) (PP2) – 52:07	5–0
T. Selänne (J. Lehtinen) – 55:08	6–0

4 min
Penalties
22 min
51
Shots
16

18 February 2006; 13:05	Italy	3–3 (1–0, 0–1, 2–2)	Germany	Palasport Olimpico, Turin; Attendance: 8,908

Game reference

Jason Muzzatti
Goalies
Olaf Kölzig
Referee:
(Finland) Timo Favorin
Linesmen:
(Sweden) Joacim Karlsson
(Slovakia) Milan Mášik

J. Parco (T. Iob) – 2:03	1–0
	1–1	26:21 – T. Martinec (T. Boos)
T. Iob (J. Parco, G. de Bettin) – 44:27	2–1
	2–2	47:16 – S. Felski (D. Kreutzer)
C. Borgatello (G. de Bettin, M. Chitaroni) (SH) – 58:28	3–2
	3–3	58:43 – M. Goc (D. Kreutzer, E. Lewandowski) (PP)

18 min
Penalties
16 min
21
Shots
34

19 February 2006; 20:05	Czech Republic	4–1 (2–0, 1–0, 1–1)	Italy	Palasport Olimpico, Turin; Attendance: 8,776

Game reference

Tomáš Vokoun
Goalies
Günther Hell (out 27:32)
Jason Muzzatti (in 27:32)
Referee:
(Russia) Vyacheslav Bulanov
Linesmen:
(Slovakia) Miroslav Halecký
(Sweden) Joacim Karlsson

M. Hejduk (D. Výborný, T. Kaberle) – 12:57	1–0
V. Prospal (J. Jágr, M. Straka) – 14:20	2–0
V. Prospal (M. Straka) (SH) – 28:36	3–0
	3–1	57:53 – J. Parco (G. de Bettin, T. Iob)
V. Prospal (M. Straka, T. Vokoun) (EN) – 58:40	4–1

20 min
Penalties
58 min
43
Shots
16

21 February 2006; 12:35	Switzerland	3–3 (2–1, 0–1, 1–1)	Italy	Palasport Olimpico, Turin; Attendance: 8,529

Game reference

David Aebischer
Goalies
Jason Muzzatti
Referee:
(United States) Dennis LaRue
Linesmen:
(Slovakia) Milan Mášik
(United States) Tony Sericolo

R. Lemm (G. Bezina, S. Blindenbacher) (PP) − 3:06	1–0
P. Fischer (M. Plüss) – 6:33	2–0
	2–1	15:41 – J. Busillo (B. Nardella) (PP)
	2–2	20:53 – C. Trevisani (J. Cirone, J. Busillo) (PP)
	2–3	46:13 – T. Iob (G. de Bettin)
I. Rüthemann – 56:38	3–3

14 min
Penalties
10 min
25
Shots
35

=== Women's tournament ===
Players

No.	Position	Name	Height	Weight	Birthdate	Birthplace	2004–05 team
2	D	Michela Angeloni	167	67	09/25/84	Bergamo	HC Lario Halloween Como
12	F	Evelyn Bazzanella – C	168	58	06/15/76	Bolzano	HC Eagles Bolzano
9	D	Valentina Bettarini	170	66	06/29/90	Bolzano	HC Eagles Bolzano
8	F	Celeste Bissardella	166	58	10/17/88	Bolzano	HC Eagles Bolzano
29	F	Heidi Caldart	167	56	10/19/83	Feltre	Agordo Hockey
18	F	Silvia Carignano	160	59	08/11/87	Pinerolo	HC All Stars Piemonte
17	F	Diana Da Rugna	160	53	10/16/89	Feltre	Agordo Hockey
25	F	Anna De la Forest	163	47	06/24/88	Turin	HC All Stars Piemonte
19	D	Nadia De Nardin	170	67	11/14/75	Agordo	Agordo Hockey
7	D	Linda De Rocco	162	53	01/03/86	Belluno	Agordo Hockey
14	D	Rebecca Fiorese	162	61	09/04/80	Milan	HC Lario Halloween Como
11	F	Sabina Florian – A	168	68	05/28/83	Bolzano	SC Riessersee
1	G	Luana Frasnelli	162	54	07/25/75	Bolzano	HC Eagles Bolzano
13	D	Manuela Friz – A	156	51	08/16/78	Agordo	Agordo Hockey
24	F	Waltraud Kaser	169	61	07/03/80	Brixen	HC Eagles Bolzano
10	F	Maria Michaela Leitner	161	54	12/30/81	Sterzing	HC Eagles Bolzano
26	G	Debora Montanari	159	58	10/17/80	Pinerolo	HC All Stars Piemonte
16	D	Katharina Sparer	163	52	02/22/90	Bolzano	HC Eagles Bolzano
27	F	Silvia Toffano	163	52	01/05/85	Venezia	HC Eagles Bolzano
23	D	Sabrina Viel	166	53	02/17/73	Belluno	Agordo Hockey

Round-robin

Pos	Team	Pld	W	D	L	GF	GA	GD	Pts	Qualification
1	Canada	3	3	0	0	36	1	+35	6	Semifinals
2	Sweden	3	2	0	1	15	9	+6	4	Semifinals
3	Russia	3	1	0	2	6	16	−10	2	5–8th place semifinals
4	Italy (H)	3	0	0	3	1	32	−31	0	5–8th place semifinals

(H) Hosts

11 February 2006; 20:35	Canada	16–0 (5–0, 4–0, 7–0)	Italy	Palasport Olimpico, Turin; Attendance: 8,399

Game reference

Kim St-Pierre
Goalies
Debora Montanari
Luana Frasnelli
Referee:
(United States) Danyel Howard
Linesmen:
(Finland) Sanna Mattila
(Netherlands) Ilse Robben

Ouellette (Hefford, MacLeod) – 01:36	1–0
Ouellette (Hefford, Botterill) – 01:52	2–0
Wickenheiser (Piper) – 04:04	3–0
Ouellette (Botterill, Campbell) (PP) – 06:53	4–0
Pounder (Kellar) – 11:34	5–0
Vaillancourt (Piper) – 20:25	6–0
MacLeod (Campbell, Apps) – 22:32	7–0
Piper (Wickenheiser, Apps) – 38:45	8–0
Wickenheiser (Piper, Apps) – 39:56	9–0
Apps (Piper, Wickenheiser) – 41:35	10–0
Botterill (Ouellette, MacLeod) – 47:31	11–0
Hefford (Ouellette, Botterill) (PP) – 48:41	12–0
Pounder – 49:42	13–0
Goyette (Campbell, Sunohara) – 52:19	14–0
Apps (Piper, Wickenheiser) (PP) – 56:15	15–0
Weatherston (Agosta, Vaillancourt) – 57:37	16–0

8 min
Penalties
10 min
66
Shots
5

13 February 2006; 15:05	Sweden	11–0 (3–0, 5–0, 3–0)	Italy	Torino Esposizioni, Turin; Attendance: 2,156

Game reference

Cecilia Andersson
Goalies
Debora Montanari
Luana Frasnelli
Referee:
(Czech Republic) Kateřina Ivičičová
Linesmen:
(Norway) Marte Hove
(Finland) Johanna Suban

Sjolander (Winberg) (PP) – 07:09	1–0
Sjolander (Lindberg, Asserholt) (PP) – 15:45	2–0
G. Andersson (Holst) – 18:15	3–0
Jansson (Eliasson) – 20:59	4–0
Holst (Rooth) – 25:05	5–0
Edstrand (Sjolander) – 31:45	6–0
Rooth (Holst) (SH) – 32:37	7–0
G. Andersson (Nevalainen) – 34:16	8–0
Sjolander (Nevalainen, Asserholt) – 49:31	9–0
Rooth (G. Andersson) (PP) – 50:55	10–0
Edstrand (Rooth, G. Andersson) (PP) – 58:08	11–0

16 min
Penalties
22 min
52
Shots
4

14 February 2006; 13:05	Italy	1–5 (1–1, 0–1, 0–3)	Russia	Torino Esposizioni, Turin; Attendance: 2,046

Debora Montanari
Goalies
Irina Gashennikova
Referee:
(Germany) Bianca Walter
Linesmen:
(France) Anne-Sophie Boniface
(Germany) Michaela Kiefer

Florian (Leitner, Bettarini) (PP2) – 8:02	1–0
	1–1	11:17 – Gladysheva (PP)
	1–2	25:51 – Trefilova (Pashkevich) (PP)
	1–3	44:31 – Gavrilova (Khomich) (PP)
	1–4	46:53 – Gavrilova (Sotnikova)
	1–5	53:04 – Trefilova (Shchelchkova) (PP)

26 min
Penalties
18 min
13
Shots
40

Classification games

5th-8th classification

17 February 2006; 18:35	Germany	5–2 (3–2, 0–0, 2–0)	Italy	Torino Esposizioni, Turin; Attendance: 2,750

Game reference

Stephanie Wartosch-Kürten
Goalies
Debora Montanari
Referee:
(Russia) Arina Ustinova
Linesmen:
(Norway) Marte Hove
(Czech Republic) Jana Zítková

Becker (M. Lanzl) – 00:27	1–0
Seiler (Tamas) (PP) – 05:32	2–0
	2–1	06:18 – Leitner
	2–2	06:59 – Leitner (Kaser, Bazzanella)
Holmes (Soesilo) – 07:47	3–2
Becker (Ritter) – 42:50	4–2
Ritter (Becker, M. Lanzl) – 55:35	5–2

22 min
Penalties
16 min
30
Shots
13

7th place game

20 February 2006; 13:05	Switzerland	11–0 (4–0, 6–0, 1–0)	Italy	Torino Esposizioni, Turin; Attendance: 2,500

Game reference

Florence Schelling
Goalies
Luana Frasnelli
Debora Montanari
Referee:
(Canada) Stephanie Normand
Linesmen:
(Russia) Marina Konstantinova
(Finland) Sanna Mattila

Diaz – 04:33	1–0
Diaz (Mosimann) (PP) – 09:54	2–0
Ju. Marty (Diaz) (PP) – 16:06	3–0
Lehmann (S. Marty) – 16:41	4–0
Ruhnke (Rochat) – 22:36	5–0
Ju. Marty (Ruhnke) – 26:51	6–0
Meier (Kunzle) – 31:09	7–0
Lehmann (Mosimann) – 32:48	8–0
Ruhnke (Rochat) – 33:16	9–0
S. Marty (Lehmann) – 35:37	10–0
S. Marty (Lehmann) – 56:08	11–0

20 min
Penalties
20 min
53
Shots
29

== Luge ==
Athlete	Event	Final					
Athlete	Event	Run 1	Run 2	Run 3	Run 4	Total	Rank
Wilfried Huber	Men's singles	52.095	51.748	51.848	51.984	3:27.675	10
Anastasia Oberstolz-Antonova	Women's singles	did not finish					
Sarah Podorieszach	Women's singles	47.858	47.647	47.519	47.850	3:10.874	11
Reinhold Rainer	Men's singles	51.926	51.696	51.647	51.733	3:27.002	8
Armin Zoeggeler	Men's singles	51.718	51.414	51.430	51.526	3:26.088	Gold medal
Patrick Gruber; Christian Oberstolz	Doubles	47.620	47.336	n/a		1:34.956	5
Oswald Haselrieder; Gerhard Plankensteiner	Doubles	47.236	47.694	n/a		1:34.930	Bronze medal

== Nordic combined ==
Davide Bresadola took part in both Nordic combined and ski jumping.

Athlete	Event	Ski jumping		Cross-country		
Athlete	Event	Points	Rank	Deficit	Time	Rank
Davide Bresadola	Sprint	102.0	31	1:35	21:43.3 +3:14.3	44
Giuseppe Michielli	Sprint	104.7	26	1:24	19:32.0 +1:03.0	16
Giuseppe Michielli	Individual Gundersen	219.5	21	2:52	42:05.5 +2:20.9	14
Daniele Munari	Sprint	89.2	44	2:26	21:03.1 +2:34.1	38
Daniele Munari	Individual Gundersen	196.5	35	4:24	45:06.3 +5:21.7	39
Alessandro Pittin	Individual Gundersen	161.5	47	6:44	48:50.2 +9:05.6	46
Jochen Strobl	Sprint	96.0	37	1:59	20:09.8 +1:40.8	30
Jochen Strobl	Individual Gundersen	190.5	41	4:48	44:42.3 +4:57.7	34
Davide Bresadola; Jochen Strobl; Daniele Munari; Giuseppe Michielli	Team	did not start				

Note: 'Deficit' refers to the amount of time behind the leader a competitor began the cross-country portion of the event. Italicized numbers show the final deficit from the winner's finishing time.

== Short track speed skating ==
Athlete	Event	Heat		Quarterfinal		Semifinal		Final	
Athlete	Event	Time	Rank	Time	Rank	Time	Rank	Time	Rank
Marta Capurso	Women's 500 m	45.217	2 Q	44.438	2 Q	45.204	4	Final B 46.899	5
Marta Capurso	Women's 1000 m	disqualified							
Marta Capurso	Women's 1500 m	2:31.053	2 Q	n/a		2:27.291	4	Final B 2:30.054	9
Fabio Carta	Men's 1000 m	1:27.826	2 Q	1:27.656	3	did not advance			8
Fabio Carta	Men's 1500 m	2:27.799	3 Q	n/a		2:19.724	3	Final B 2:24.658	7
Arianna Fontana	Women's 500 m	45.398	2 Q	44.948	3	did not advance			11
Arianna Fontana	Women's 1000 m	1:32.033	2 Q	1:33.401	1 Q	1:33.228	4	Final B 1:34.269	6
Nicola Rodigari	Men's 500 m	42.189	2 Q	43.701	2 Q	42.131	4	Final B 42.398	7
Nicola Rodigari	Men's 1000 m	1:27.184	2 Q	1:27.240	3	did not advance			7
Nicola Rodigari	Men's 1500 m	2:29.885	2 Q	n/a		2:18.615	6	did not advance	14
Roberto Serra	Men's 500 m	43.120	2 Q	42.773	3	did not advance			9
Katia Zini	Women's 1500 m	2:41.561	3 Q	n/a		2:23.141	4	Final B 2:30.164	10
Fabio Carta; Nicola Rodigari; Nicola Franceschina; Yuri Confortola	Men's 5000 m relay	n/a				7:07.358	3 ADV	6:48.597	4
Marta Capurso; Arianna Fontana; Katia Zini; Mara Zini	Women's 3000 m relay	n/a				4:19.797	2 Q	4:20.030	Bronze medal

Key: 'ADV' indicates a skater was advanced due to being interfered with.

== Skeleton ==
Athlete	Event	Final			
Athlete	Event	Run 1	Run 2	Total	Rank
Maurizio Oioli	Men's	59.28	59.24	1:58.52	12
Costanza Zanoletti	Women's	1:00.99	1:01.18	2:02.17	5

== Ski jumping ==
Davide Bresadola took part in both Nordic combined and ski jumping.

Athlete	Event	Qualifying		First round		Final		
Athlete	Event	Points	Rank	Points	Rank	Points	Total	Rank
Alessio Bolognani	Normal hill	100.5	40	did not advance				40
Alessio Bolognani	Large hill	74.9	33 Q	70.7	44	did not advance		44
Sebastian Colloredo	Normal hill	118.0	14 Q	113.5	30 Q	113.0	226.5	27
Sebastian Colloredo	Large hill	94.1	13 Q	90.2	36	did not advance		36
Andrea Morassi	Normal hill	107.5	30 Q	108.5	36	did not advance		36
Andrea Morassi	Large hill	45.7	50	did not advance				50
Alessio Bolognani; Davide Bresadola; Sebastian Colloredo; Andrea Morassi	Team	n/a		328.4	11	did not advance		11

Note: PQ indicates a skier was pre-qualified for the final, based on entry rankings.

== Snowboarding ==
Halfpipe

Athlete	Event	Qualifying run 1		Qualifying run 2		Final		
Athlete	Event	Points	Rank	Points	Rank	Run 1	Run 2	Rank
Tania Detomas	Women's halfpipe	29.7	13	33.6	8	did not advance		14
Giacomo Kratter	Men's halfpipe	12.8	36	37.0	7	did not advance		13
Romina Masolini	Women's halfpipe	12.7	27	20.5	19	did not advance		25
Manuel Pietropoli	Men's halfpipe	12.3	37	4.1	37	did not advance		43

Note: In the final, the single best score from two runs is used to determine the ranking. A bracketed score indicates a run that wasn't counted.

Parallel GS

Athlete	Event	Qualification		Round of 16	Quarterfinals	Semifinals	Finals	
Athlete	Event	Time	Rank	Opposition Time	Opposition Time	Opposition Time	Opposition Time	Rank
Corinna Boccacini	Women's parallel giant slalom	1:23.40	19	did not advance				19
Isabella Dal Balcon	Women's parallel giant slalom	1:22.55	13 Q	Boldikova (RUS) (4); L +18.13 (-0.32 +18.45)	did not advance			13
Meinhard Erlacher	Men's parallel giant slalom	1:13.22	22	did not advance				22
Roland Fischnaller	Men's parallel giant slalom	1:11.61	12 Q	Jaquet (SUI) (5); L +0.51 (0.00 +0.51)	did not advance			13
Rudi Galli	Men's parallel giant slalom	disqualified						
Marion Posch	Women's parallel giant slalom	1:22.89	15 Q	Fletcher (USA) (2); L +0.96 (+0.47 +0.49)	did not advance			15
Carmen Ranigler	Women's parallel giant slalom	1:25.23	26	did not advance				26
Simone Salvati	Men's parallel giant slalom	1:13.48	24	did not advance				24

Key: '+ Time' represents a deficit; the brackets indicate the results of each run.

Snowboard Cross

Athlete	Event	Qualifying		1/8 finals	Quarterfinals	Semifinals	Finals	
Athlete	Event	Time	Rank	Position	Position	Position	Position	Rank
Simone Malusa	Men's snowboard cross	1:23.53	33	did not advance				33
Stefano Pozzolini	Men's snowboard cross	1:22.23	19 Q	3	did not advance			24
Carmen Ranigler	Women's snowboard cross	1:32.91	18	did not advance				18
Alberto Schiavon	Men's snowboard cross	1:22.38	22 Q	3	did not advance			26
Tommaso Tagliaferri	Men's snowboard cross	1:20.93	4 Q	2	3	did not advance	Classification 9-12; 3	11

== Speed skating ==
Athlete	Event	Race 1		Final	
Athlete	Event	Time	Rank	Time	Rank
Matteo Anesi	Men's 1500 m	n/a		1:49.88	29
Maurizio Carnino	Men's 500 m	36.24	36.43	1:12.67	31
Maurizio Carnino	Men's 1000 m	n/a		1:11.44	30
Stefano Donagrandi	Men's 1500 m	n/a		1:48.85	22
Stefano Donagrandi	Men's 5000 m	n/a		6:33.45	16
Stefano Donagrandi	Men's 10000 m	n/a		13:47,67	13
Enrico Fabris	Men's 1500 m	n/a		1:45.97	Gold medal
Enrico Fabris	Men's 5000 m	n/a		6:18.25	Bronze medal
Enrico Fabris	Men's 10000 m	n/a		13:21.54	8
Ermanno Ioriatti	Men's 500 m	35.88	35.80	1:11.68	21
Ermanno Ioriatti	Men's 1000 m	disqualified			
Adelia Marra	Women's 1500 m	n/a		2:03.07	31
Adelia Marra	Women's 3000 m	n/a		4:16.27	20
Ippolito Sanfratello	Men's 1500 m	n/a		1:48.44	18
Ippolito Sanfratello	Men's 5000 m	n/a		6:32.58	14
Ippolito Sanfratello	Men's 10000 m	n/a		13:41.91	12
Chiara Simionato	Women's 500 m	39.02	38.66	1:17.68	10
Chiara Simionato	Women's 1000 m	n/a		1:17.53	13
Chiara Simionato	Women's 1500 m	n/a		1:58.76	5

Team Pursuit

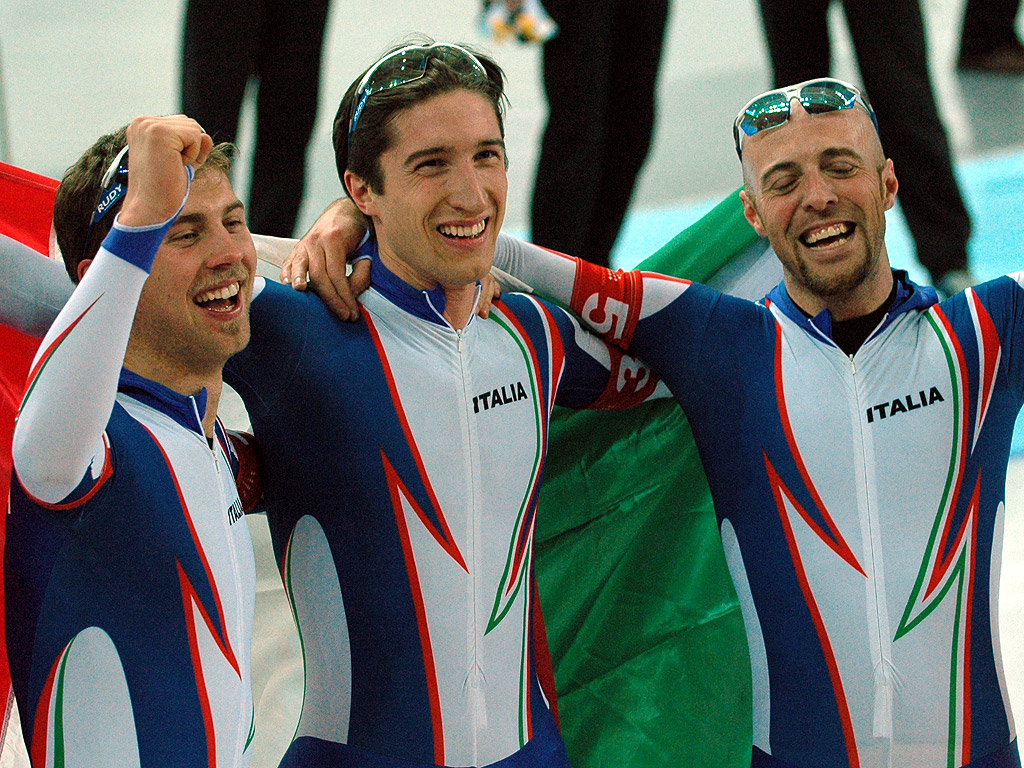
Men's team after winning the team pursuit

Athlete	Event	Seeding		Quarterfinal	Semifinal	Final	
Athlete	Event	Time	Rank	Opposition Time	Opposition Time	Opposition Time	Rank
From: Matteo Anesi; Stefano Donagrandi; Enrico Fabris; Ippolito Sanfratello	Men's team pursuit	3:47.79	2	United States (7); W 3:43.64 OR	Netherlands (3); W Overtaken	Canada (1); W 3:44.46	Gold medal

== Athlete's oath ==
Italian skier Giorgio Rocca delivered the Olympic Oath at the opening ceremonies of the Olympics.
