= Australia at the 2006 Winter Olympics =

- IOC code: AUS
- NOC: Australian Olympic Committee
- Website: www.olympics.com.au

in Turin
- Competitors: 40 (23 men, 17 women) in 10 sports
- Flag bearers: Alisa Camplin (opening); Dale Begg-Smith (closing)
- Medals Ranked 17th: Gold 1 Silver 0 Bronze 1 Total 2

Winter Olympics appearances (overview)
- 1936; 1948; 1952; 1956; 1960; 1964; 1968; 1972; 1976; 1980; 1984; 1988; 1992; 1994; 1998; 2002; 2006; 2010; 2014; 2018; 2022; 2026

Australia competed at the 2006 Winter Olympics in Turin, Italy. The team of 40 athletes was the largest ever for Australia, surpassing the team of 31 that participated at the 1960 Winter Olympics.

Prior to the Olympics, Australia had set a goal of winning one medal. They were able to win two medals – one gold and one bronze – and had several other top 10 finishes.

Alisa Camplin served as flag bearer at the opening ceremonies.

== Medalists ==
Medal	Name	Sport	Event	Date
Gold	Dale Begg-Smith	Freestyle skiing	Men's moguls	15 February
Bronze	Alisa Camplin	Freestyle skiing	Women's aerials	22 February

== Alpine skiing ==
Five Australian skiers competed in Turin, but only one, Craig Branch, finished a run. Branch was the first starter for the men's downhill, and his 32nd place was the highest finish for an Australian alpine skier since Calgary '88.

Athlete	Event	Final				
Athlete	Event	Run 1	Run 2	Run 3	Total	Rank
A. J. Bear	Men's super-G	Did not finish				
Craig Branch	Men's downhill	n/a			1:52.55	32
Jono Brauer	Men's slalom	Did not finish				
Jono Brauer	Men's combined	Did not finish				
Bradley Wall	Men's giant slalom	Did not finish				

Note: In the men's combined, runs 1 is the downhill, and runs 2 and 3 are the slalom. In the women's combined, run 1 and 2 are the slalom, and run 3 the downhill.

== Biathlon ==
Cameron Morton, a primary school principal, and the only Australian biathlete in Turin, was aiming for a top-fifty finish, but failed to make the top 80 in either of his two events. He was the fifth Australian to compete in an Olympic biathlon.

Athlete	Event	Final		
Athlete	Event	Time	Misses	Rank
Cameron Morton	Men's sprint	32:07.4	4	81
Cameron Morton	Men's individual	1:07:03.7	7	82

== Bobsleigh ==
The men's pair of Rolleston and McKenzie equalled the best Australian finish in the event by placing 22nd, while Loch-Wilkinson and Reed were the first to represent the country in women's bobsleigh. Australia also attempted to enter a four-man team in Turin, appealing to the IOC and the CAS after it was revealed a Brazilian athlete had tested positive for nandrolone in a pre-Olympic test. The athlete in question had competed in a qualifying race won by Brazil, with New Zealand second and Australia third, with the top two teams advancing. The disqualification of the Brazilian entry from that race could have allowed Australia to compete, but the IOC, FIBT and CAS rejected the appeal.

Athlete	Event	Final					
Athlete	Event	Run 1	Run 2	Run 3	Run 4	Total	Rank
Jeremy Rolleston; Shane McKenzie	Two-man	56.77	56.59	57.22	Did not advance		22
Astrid Loch-Wilkinson; Kylie Reed	Two-woman	58.53	58.85	59.00	58.73	3:55.11	14

== Cross-country skiing ==
Australia sent 3 skiers to compete in the cross country events, its largest contingent at a Winter Olympics.

Distance

Athlete	Event	Final	
Athlete	Event	Total	Rank
Clare-Louise Brumley	Women's 15 km pursuit	47:03.1	42

Sprint

Athlete	Event	Qualifying		Quarterfinal		Semifinal		Final	
Athlete	Event	Total	Rank	Total	Rank	Total	Rank	Total	Rank
Esther Bottomley	Women's sprint	2:23.55	52	did not advance					
Paul Murray	Men's sprint	2:25.29	51	did not advance					

== Figure skating ==
Joanne Carter, who had placed 12th at the 1998 Olympics, finished 25th in the women's short program, failing to advance to the free skate.

Athlete	Event	CD		SP/OD		FS/FD		Total	
Athlete	Event	Points	Rank	Points	Rank	Points	Rank	Points	Rank
Joanne Carter	Ladies'	40.86	25	did not advance					

Key: CD = Compulsory Dance, FD = Free Dance, FS = Free Skate, OD = Original Dance, SP = Short Program

== Freestyle skiing ==
Canadian-born Dale Begg-Smith entered the Games as the top ranked man in moguls, and won Australia's only gold medal in Turin. 2002 Winter Olympics gold medallist Alisa Camplin also won a medal, bronze in the women's aerials. This made her the first Australian athlete to win back-to-back medals in a winter sport. Camplin won a medal despite having major surgery on her knee four months before the Turin games. Jacqui Cooper set a world record in qualifying for the women's aerials, but ended up 8th in the final.

Men

Athlete	Event	Qualifying		Final	
Athlete	Event	Points	Rank	Points	Rank
Dale Begg-Smith	Moguls	25.40	1 Q	26.77	Gold medal
Jason Begg-Smith	Moguls	20.22	29	Did not advance	
Nick Fisher	Moguls	22.89	16 Q	23.39	12
Michael Robertson	Moguls	21.52	24	Did not advance	

Women

Athlete	Event	Qualifying		Final	
Athlete	Event	Points	Rank	Points	Rank
Manuela Berchtold	Moguls	22.19	16 Q	22.21	14
Alisa Camplin	Aerials	165.32	10 Q	191.39	Bronze medal
Jacqui Cooper	Aerials	213.36	1 Q	152.69	8
Elizabeth Gardner	Aerials	127.42	23	Did not advance	
Lydia Ierodiaconou	Aerials	155.45	14	Did not advance	

== Luge ==
Hannah Campbell-Pegg was the lone lugist representing Australia in Turin. She finished 23rd overall.

Athlete	Event	Final					
Athlete	Event	Run 1	Run 2	Run 3	Run 4	Total	Rank
Hannah Campbell-Pegg	Women's singles	49.577	49.350	49.574	49.038	3:17.539	23

== Short track speed skating ==
Four years after Stephen Bradbury won a gold medal in short track, Australia's first, no Australian skater managed to advance to an A final. The best performance came from the men's relay, which won the B final to finish sixth.

Athlete	Event	Heat		Quarterfinal		Semifinal		Final	
Athlete	Event	Time	Rank	Time	Rank	Time	Rank	Time	Rank
Alex McEwan	Men's 500 m	45.173	4	Did not advance					22
Mark McNee	Men's 1000 m	1:30.033	4	Did not advance					20
Mark McNee	Men's 1500 m	2:29.356	4	Did not advance					20
Emily Rosemond	Women's 1000 m	2:40.171	5	Did not advance					25
Emily Rosemond	Women's 1500 m	1:39.942	2 Q	1:37.627	3	Did not advance			12
Lachlan Hay; Stephen Lee; Mark McNee; Elliot Shriane	Men's 5000 m relay	n/a				7:03.356	4	Final B 7:01.666	6

== Skeleton ==
Michelle Steele, who was recruited to participate in the skeleton just 14 months before the Games, finished 13th in the women's event. Steele was part of a program created by the Australian Institute of Sport to develop Australian winter athletes by converting athletes from summer sports.

Athlete	Event	Final			
Athlete	Event	Run 1	Run 2	Total	Rank
Shaun Boyle	Men's	1:00.13	1:00.00	2:00.13	22
Michelle Steele	Women's	1:01.26	1:02.21	2:03.47	13

== Snowboarding ==
Nine snowboarders represented Australia across each of the three disciplines, but only one, Torah Bright qualified for a medal final. Bright was touted as a medal threat, and though she failed to qualify in the first round, she finished 1st in the second to make the final. She struggled in her first run of the final, ending up 10th, but improved to 5th after the second run.

Halfpipe

Athlete	Event	Qualifying Run 1		Qualifying Run 2		Final		
Athlete	Event	Points	Rank	Points	Rank	Run 1	Run 2	Rank
Mitchell Allan	Men's halfpipe	28.8	8	23.7	25	Did not advance		31
Torah Bright	Women's halfpipe	32.0	10	43.1	1 Q	(17.0)	41.0	5
Andrew Burton	Men's halfpipe	15.2	34	21.8	26	Did not advance		32
Holly Crawford	Women's halfpipe	19.0	22	29.9	18	Did not advance		18
Ben Mates	Men's halfpipe	4.9	43	5.0	36	Did not advance		42

Note: In the final, the single best score from two runs is used to determine the ranking. A bracketed score indicates the run in the final that wasn't counted.

Parallel GS

Athlete	Event	Qualification		Round of 16	Quarterfinals	Semifinals	Finals
Athlete	Event	Time	Rank	Opposition Time	Opposition Time	Opposition Time	Opposition Time
Emanuel Oppliger	Men's parallel giant slalom	1:12.11	15 Q	Schoch (SUI) (2); L +1.37 (+0.89 +0:48)	Did not advance		
Johanna Shaw	Women's parallel giant slalom	1:38.86	29	Did not advance			

Key: '+ Time' represents a deficit; the brackets indicate the results of each run.

Snowboard cross

Athlete	Event	Qualifying		1/8 finals	Quarterfinals	Semifinals	Finals	
Athlete	Event	Time	Rank	Position	Position	Position	Position	Rank
Damon Hayler	Men's snowboard cross	1:21.51	12 Q	1 Q	2 Q	3 Q	3 Small final	7
Emily Thomas	Women's snowboard cross	1:34.57	21	Did not advance				

== See also ==
- Australia at the 2006 Winter Paralympics
- Australia at the Winter Olympics
