= Short-track speed skating at the 2006 Winter Olympics – Men's 500 metres =

Men's 500 metres at the XX Olympic Winter Games
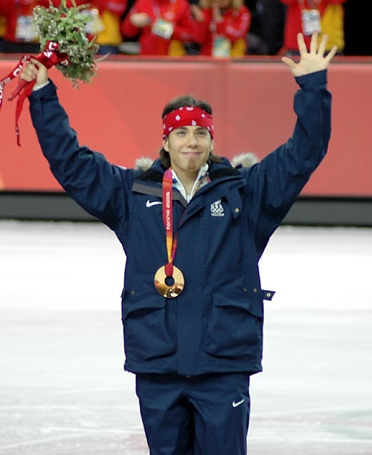
- Gold medal winner Apolo Ohno
- Venue: Torino Palavela
- Dates: 22–25 February 2006
- Competitors: 27 from 16 nations

Medalists
1st place, gold medalist(s)		Apolo Ohno	United States
2nd place, silver medalist(s)		François-Louis Tremblay	Canada
3rd place, bronze medalist(s)		Ahn Hyun-soo	South Korea

The men's 500 metres in short track speed skating at the 2006 Winter Olympics began on 22 February, with the final on 25 February, at the Torino Palavela.

== Records ==
Prior to this competition, the existing world and Olympic records were as follows:

World record	Jean-Francois Monette (CAN)	41.163	Calgary, Canada	18 October 2003
Olympic record	Marc Gagnon (CAN)	41.802	Salt Lake City, United States	23 February 2002

No new world and Olympic records were set during this competition.

== Results ==
=== Heats ===
The first round was held on 22 February. There were seven heats of three or four skaters each, with the top two finishers and the two fastest third-place skaters moving on to the quarterfinals.

Heat 1

Heat	Rank	Athlete	Country	Result	Notes
1	1	Ahn Hyun-soo	South Korea	42.960	Q
1	2	Dariusz Kulesza	Poland	42.960	Q
1	3	Tyson Heung	Germany	43.572	
2	1	Éric Bédard	Canada	42.480	Q
2	2	Jon Eley	Great Britain	42.511	Q
2	3	Vyacheslav Kurginyan	Russia	43.183	
2	4	Alex McEwan	Australia	45.173	
3	1	Wim de Deyne	Belgium	42.883	Q
3	2	Arian Nachbar	Germany	43.006	Q
3	3	Volodymyr Grygoriev	Ukraine	43.583	
3	4	Matus Uzak	Slovakia	45.173	
4	1	Satoru Terao	Japan	42.607	Q
4	2	François-Louis Tremblay	Canada	42.779	Q
4	3	Cees Juffermans	Netherlands	42.849	q
4	4	Seo Ho-jin	South Korea		DSQ
5	1	Li Juajun	China	42.914	Q
5	2	Peter Darazs	Hungary	42.929	Q
5	3	Mikhail Razhin	Russia	44.077	
5	4	Anthony Lobello	United States	1:13.722	
6	1	Lee Ho-suk	South Korea	42.676	Q
6	2	Li Haonan	China	42.703	Q
6	3	Nicola Rodigari	Italy	42.819	q
6	4	Pieter Gysel	Belgium	42.980	
7	1	Apolo Anton Ohno	United States	42.836	Q
7	2	Roberto Serra	Italy	43.120	Q
7	3	Takafumi Nishitani	Japan	43.212	
7	4	Paul Stanley	Great Britain	43.486	

=== Quarterfinals ===
The top two finishers in each of the four quarterfinals advanced to the semifinals.

Quarterfinal 1

Rank	Athlete	Country	Result	Notes
1	Ahn Hyun-soo	South Korea	42.213	Q
2	Satoru Terao	Japan	42.471	Q
3	Cees Juffermans	Netherlands	42.515	
4	Arian Nachbar	Germany	42.605	

Quarterfinal 2

Rank	Athlete	Country	Result	Notes
1	Li Juajun	China	43.105	Q
2	Nicola Rodigari	Italy	43.701	Q
3	Peter Darazs	Hungary	1:01.289	
4	Lee Ho-suk	South Korea	1:22.896	

Quarterfinal 3

Rank	Athlete	Country	Result	Notes
1	Éric Bédard	Canada	42.267	Q
2	Jon Eley	Great Britain	42.424	Q
3	Roberto Serra	Italy	42.773	
4	Li Haonan	China		DSQ

Quarterfinal 4

Rank	Athlete	Country	Result	Notes
1	Apolo Anton Ohno	United States	42.020	Q
2	François-Louis Tremblay	Canada	42.110	Q
3	Wim de Deyne	Belgium	42.979	
4	Dariusz Kulesza	Poland		DSQ

=== Semifinals ===
The top two finishers in each of the two semifinals qualified for the A final, while the third and fourth place skaters advanced to the B Final. In the first semifinal, China's Li Jiajun impeded Britain's Jon Eley, resulting in Li's disqualification, while Eley, who finished third in the race, was advanced to the final.

Semifinal 1

Rank	Athlete	Country	Result	Notes
1	François-Louis Tremblay	Canada	42.261	QA
2	Apolo Anton Ohno	United States	42.400	QA
3	Jon Eley	Great Britain	42.650	ADV
4	Li Juajun	China		DSQ

Semifinal 2

Rank	Athlete	Country	Result	Notes
1	Ahn Hyun-soo	South Korea	41.826	QA
2	Éric Bédard	Canada	41.950	QA
3	Satoru Terao	Japan	42.120	QB
4	Nicola Rodigari	Italy	42.131	QB

=== Finals ===
The five qualifying skaters competed in Final A, while two other raced for 6th place in Final B.

Final A

Rank	Athlete	Country	Result	Notes
1st place, gold medalist(s)	Apolo Anton Ohno	United States	41.935	
2nd place, silver medalist(s)	François-Louis Tremblay	Canada	42.002	
3rd place, bronze medalist(s)	Ahn Hyun-soo	South Korea	42.089	
4	Éric Bédard	Canada	42.093	
5	Jon Eley	Great Britain	42.497	

Final B

Rank	Athlete	Country	Result	Notes
6	Satoru Terao	Japan	42.377	
7	Nicola Rodigari	Italy	42.398	
