= Short-track speed skating at the 2006 Winter Olympics – Men's 1000 metres =

Men's 1000 metres at the XX Olympic Winter Games
- Pictogram for short track
- Venue: Torino Palavela
- Dates: 15–18 February 2006
- Competitors: 26 from 17 nations

Medalists
1st place, gold medalist(s)		Ahn Hyun-soo	South Korea
2nd place, silver medalist(s)		Lee Ho-suk	South Korea
3rd place, bronze medalist(s)		Apolo Anton Ohno	United States

The men's 1000 metres in short track speed skating at the 2006 Winter Olympics began on 15 February, with the final on 18 February, at the Torino Palavela.

== Records ==
Prior to this competition, the existing world and Olympic records were as follows:

World record	Li Jiajun (CHN)	1:24.674	Bormio, Italy	14 February 2004
Olympic record	Mathieu Turcotte (CAN)	1:27.185	Salt Lake City, United States	16 February 2002

The following new world and Olympic records were set during this competition.

Date	Event	Team	Time	OR	WR
15 February	Heat 1	Li Ye (CHN)	1:27.048	OR	
18 February	Quarterfinal 1	Rusty Smith (USA)	1:27.000	OR	
18 February	Final A	Ahn Hyun-soo (KOR)	1:26.739	OR	

== Results ==
=== Heats ===
The first round was held on 15 February. There were seven heats of three or four skaters each, with the top two finishers and the two fastest third-place finishers also moving on to the quarterfinals. As two skaters tied for the second-fastest third-place time, three skaters advanced through this method. Two other skaters were advanced after being interfered with.

Heats

Heat	Rank	Athlete	Country	Result	Notes
1	1	Li Ye	China	1:27.048	Q OR
1	2	Nicola Rodigari	Italy	1:27.184	Q
1	3	Jean Charles Mattei	France	1:28.009	
1	4	Paul Stanley	Great Britain	1:28.511	
2	1	François-Louis Tremblay	Canada	1:28.925	Q
2	2	Satoru Terao	Japan	1:29.090	Q
2	3	Jon Eley	Great Britain	1:29.147	
2	4	Mark McNee	Australia	1:30.033	
3	1	Ahn Hyun-soo	South Korea	1:27.372	Q
3	2	Rusty Smith	United States	1:27.508	Q
3	3	Peter Darazs	Hungary	1:27.929	q
4	1	Lee Ho-suk	South Korea	1:35.634	Q
4	2	Matus Uzak	Slovakia	1:35.989	Q
4	3	Vyacheslav Kurginyan	Russia	1:36.070	
5	1	Éric Bédard	Canada	1:28.274	Q
5	2	Dariusz Kulesza	Poland	1:29.102	Q
5	3	Sebastian Praus	Germany	1:35.375	ADV
5	–	Maxime Chataignier	France	DQ	
6	1	Li Jiajun	China	1:27.765	Q
6	2	Fabio Carta	Italy	1:27.826	Q
6	3	Pieter Gysel	Belgium	1:27.994	q
6	4	Arian Nachbar	Germany	1:27.994	q
7	1	Apolo Anton Ohno	United States	1:36.120	Q
7	2	Volodymyr Grygoriev	Ukraine	1:36.397	Q
7	3	Mikhail Rajine	Russia	1:42.677	ADV
7	–	Niels Kerstholt	Netherlands	DQ	

=== Quarterfinals ===
The top two finishers in each of the four quarterfinals advanced to the semifinals.

Quarterfinal 1

Rank	Athlete	Country	Result	Notes
1	Rusty Smith	United States	1:27.000	Q OR
2	Li Ye	China	1:27.078	Q
3	Nicola Rodigari	Italy	1:27.240	
4	Mikhail Rajine	Russia	1:32.432	
–	Matus Uzak	Slovakia	DQ	

Quarterfinal 2

Rank	Athlete	Country	Result	Notes
1	Ahn Hyun-Soo	South Korea	1:29.371	Q
2	Apolo Anton Ohno	United States	1:29.650	Q
3	Sebastian Praus	Germany	1:29.820	
4	Dariusz Kulesza	Poland	1:30.556	

Quarterfinal 3

Rank	Athlete	Country	Result	Notes
1	Li Juajun	China	1:28.179	Q
2	Pieter Gysel	Belgium	1:28.335	Q
3	Satoru Terao	Japan	1:28.499	
4	Peter Darazs	Hungary	1:28.738	
–	François-Louis Tremblay	Canada	DQ	

Quarterfinal 4

Rank	Athlete	Country	Result	Notes
1	Lee Ho-suk	South Korea	1:27.265	Q
2	Éric Bédard	Canada	1:27.546	Q
3	Fabio Carta	Italy	1:27.656	
4	Arian Nachbar	Germany	1:27.679	
5	Volodymyr Grygoriev	Ukraine	1:29.168	

=== Semifinals ===
The top two finishers in each of the two semifinals qualified for the A final, while the third and fourth place skaters advanced to the B Final. In the first semifinal, China's Li Ye fell, but he was advanced to the final after Belgium's Pieter Gysel was disqualified.

Semifinal 1

Rank	Athlete	Country	Result	Notes
1	Lee Ho-suk	South Korea	1:29.150	QA
2	Rusty Smith	United States	1:29.515	QA
3	Li Ye	China	1:47.965	ADV
–	Pieter Gysel	Belgium	DQ	

Semifinal 2

Rank	Athlete	Country	Result	Notes
1	Ahn Hyun-Soo	South Korea	1:27.900	QA
2	Apolo Anton Ohno	United States	1:28.080	QA
3	Li Jiajun	China	1:29.183	QB
–	Éric Bédard	Canada	DQ	

=== Finals ===
The five qualifying skaters competed in Final A. Since only one skater qualified for the B Final (the two disqualified semifinalists did not advance), it was not contested, and China's Li Jiajun was awarded 6th place.

Final A

Rank	Athlete	Country	Result	Notes
1st place, gold medalist(s)	Ahn Hyun-soo	South Korea	1:26.739	OR
2nd place, silver medalist(s)	Lee Ho-suk	South Korea	1:26.764	
3rd place, bronze medalist(s)	Apolo Anton Ohno	United States	1:26.927	
4	Rusty Smith	United States	1:27.435	
5	Li Ye	China	1:29.918	
