= Luge at the 2006 Winter Olympics – Women's singles =

Women's singles at the XX Olympic Winter Games
- Pictogram for luge
- Venue: Cesana Pariol
- Dates: February 13 – 14, 2006
- Competitors: 30 from 15 nations

Medalists
1st place, gold medalist(s)		Sylke Otto	Germany
2nd place, silver medalist(s)		Silke Kraushaar	Germany
3rd place, bronze medalist(s)		Tatjana Hüfner	Germany

The women's luge at the 2006 Winter Olympics began on February 13, and was completed on February 14 at Cesana Pariol.

== Results ==
Runs 1 and 2 were held on February 13, and runs 3 and 4 on February 14. The women's luge event was plagued with injury resulting from five separate crashes and many near misses. Kraushaar's silver gave her a complete set of medals earned at the Winter Olympics in women's singles.

Place	Athlete	Country	Run 1	Run 2	Run 3	Run 4	Total	Behind
Gold medal	Sylke Otto	Germany	47.041	46.820	46.902	47.216	3:07.979	—
Silver medal	Silke Kraushaar	Germany	47.269	46.860	46.991	46.995	3:08.115	+0.136
Bronze medal	Tatjana Hüfner	Germany	47.109	47.269	47.101	46.981	3:08.460	+0.481
4	Courtney Zablocki	United States	47.253	47.129	47.234	47.236	3:08.852	+0.873
5	Veronika Halder	Austria	47.426	47.137	47.246	47.278	3:09.087	+1.108
6	Liliya Ludan	Ukraine	47.439	47.378	47.150	47.308	3:09.275	+1.296
7	Anna Orlova	Latvia	47.654	47.317	47.280	47.232	3:09.483	+1.504
8	Nina Reithmayer	Austria	47.485	47.532	47.333	47.223	3:09.573	+1.594
9	Martina Kocher	Switzerland	47.548	47.410	47.276	47.357	3:09.591	+1.612
10	Regan Lauscher	Canada	47.584	47.418	47.320	47.321	3:09.643	+1.664
11	Sarah Podorieszach	Italy	47.858	47.647	47.519	47.850	3:10.874	+2.895
12	Erin Hamlin	United States	48.660	47.816	47.534	47.280	3:11.290	+3.311
13	Madoka Harada	Japan	48.042	47.852	47.989	47.767	3:11.650	+3.671
14	Alexandra Rodionova	Russia	48.165	47.935	48.186	47.881	3:12.167	+4.188
15	Ewelina Staszulonek	Poland	48.653	47.666	48.293	47.567	3:12.179	+4.200
16	Julia Anashkina	Russia	47.952	48.190	48.059	48.208	3:12.409	+4.430
17	Maija Tiruma	Latvia	49.623	47.987	47.889	47.545	3:13.044	+5.065
18	Aiva Aparjode	Latvia	48.934	47.957	47.721	48.453	3:13.065	+5.086
19	Veronika Sabolova	Slovakia	49.680	48.226	48.095	48.060	3:14.061	+6.082
20	Alex Gough	Canada	48.286	49.902	47.922	48.045	3:14.155	+6.176
21	Anastasija Skulkina	Russia	49.174	48.089	50.033	48.072	3:15.368	+7.389
22	Jana Sisajova	Slovakia	48.860	50.267	48.479	49.387	3:16.993	+9.014
23	Hannah Campbell-Pegg	Australia	49.577	49.350	49.574	49.038	3:17.539	+9.56
24	Michelle Despain	Argentina	50.062	54.061	50.120	52.898	3:27.141	+19.162
—	Sonja Manzenreiter	Austria	47.308	47.200	DNF	—	—	—
—	Meaghan Simister	Canada	48.585	48.682	DNF	—	—	—
—	Samantha Retrosi	United States	47.861	DNF	—	—	—	—
—	Natalia Yakushenko	Ukraine	54.189	DNS	—	—	—	—
—	Anastasia Oberstolz-Antonova	Italy	DNF	—	—	—	—	—
—	Marketa Jeriova	Czech Republic	DNF	—	—	—	—	—
