= Michael Robertson =

Michael, Mick or Mike Robertson may refer to:

== Sportsmen ==
- Michael Robertson (tennis) (born 1963), South African, later American tennis player
- Michael Robertson (discus thrower) (born 1983), American discus thrower
- Michael Robertson (rugby league) (born 1983), Scotland international rugby league footballer
- Mike Robertson (rugby union), Scottish international rugby union player
- Michael Robertson (baseball), American college baseball coach
- Michael Robertson (skier) (born 1982), Australian Olympic skier
- Mike Robertson (baseball) (born 1970), Major League Baseball utility player
- Mike Robertson (snowboarder) (born 1985), Canadian snowboarder

== Others ==
- Michael Robertson (businessman) (born 1967), founder of MP3.com and Lindows.com
- Michael Robertson (filmmaker), Australian film director and producer
- Mick Robertson (born 1946), British children's TV presenter

== See also ==
- Robertson (surname)
