= Short-track speed skating at the 2006 Winter Olympics – Men's 1500 metres =

Men's 1500 metres at the XX Olympic Winter Games
- Venue: Torino Palavela
- Dates: 12 February 2006
- Competitors: 28 from 16 nations

Medalists
1st place, gold medalist(s)		Ahn Hyun-soo	South Korea
2nd place, silver medalist(s)		Lee Ho-suk	South Korea
3rd place, bronze medalist(s)		Li Jiajun	China

The men's 1500 metres in short track speed skating at the 2006 Winter Olympics took place on 12 February at the Torino Palavela.

== Records ==
Prior to this competition, the existing world and Olympic records were as follows:

World record	Ahn Hyun-soo (KOR)	2:10.639	Marquette, United States	24 October 2003
Olympic record	Kim Dong-sung (KOR)	2:15.942	Salt Lake City, United States	20 February 2002

No new world and Olympic records were set during this competition.

== Results ==
=== Heats ===
The first round was held on 12 February. There were six heats of four or five skaters each, with the top three finishers in each advancing to the semifinals.

Heat 1

Heat	Rank	Athlete	Country	Result	Notes
1	1	Mathieu Turcotte	Canada	2:23.402	Q
1	2	Pieter Gysel	Belgium	2:23.411	Q
1	3	Jon Eley	Great Britain	2:23.887	Q
1	4	Maxime Chataignier	France	2:23.966	
1	5	Dariusz Kulesza	Poland	2:24.118	
2	1	Lee Ho-suk	South Korea	2:31.511	Q
2	2	Satoru Terao	Japan	2:31.903	Q
2	3	Vyacheslav Kurginyan	Russia	2:33.802	Q
2	–	Wim de Deyne	Belgium	DQ	
3	1	Li Ye	China	2:27.622	Q
3	2	Cees Juffermans	Netherlands	2:27.696	Q
3	3	Fabio Carta	Italy	2:27.799	Q
3	4	Mark McNee	Australia	2:29.356	
3	5	Mikhail Rajine	Russia	2:33.809	
4	1	Ahn Hyun-soo	South Korea	2:29.808	Q
4	2	Nicola Rodigari	Italy	2:29.885	Q
4	3	Peter Darazs	Hungary	2:30.281	Q
4	4	Sebastian Praus	Germany	2:30.292	
5	1	Charles Hamelin	Canada	2:19.469	Q
5	2	Li Jiajun	China	2:19.631	Q
5	3	Alex Izykowski	United States	2:19.731	Q
5	4	Tyson Heung	Germany	2:20.075	
6	1	Apolo Anton Ohno	United States	2:23.668	Q
6	2	Niels Kerstholt	Netherlands	2:23.854	Q
6	3	Viktor Knoch	Hungary	2:23.876	Q
6	4	Hayato Sueyoshi	Japan	2:25.280	
6	–	Matus Uzak	Slovakia	DQ	

=== Semifinals ===
The top two finishers in each of the three, six-man semifinals advanced to the A final, while the third and fourth place skaters advanced to the B Final.

Semifinal 1

Rank	Athlete	Result	Notes	
1	Charles Hamelin	Canada	2:20.854	QA
2	Lee Ho-suk	South Korea	2:20.901	QA
3	Niels Kerstholt	Netherlands	2:21.748	QB
4	Satoru Terao	Japan	2:21.774	QB
5	Jon Eley	Great Britain	2:21.862	
6	Vyacheslav Kurginyan	Russia	2:24.604	

Semifinal 2

Rank	Athlete	Result	Notes	
1	Ahn Hyun-soo	South Korea}	2:17.718	QA
2	Li Jiajun	China	2:17.836	QA
3	Mathieu Turcotte	Canada	2:18.280	QB
4	Peter Darazs	Hungary	2:18.348	QB
5	Alex Izykowski	United States	2:18.610	
6	Nicola Rodigari	Italy	2:18.615	

Semifinal 3

Rank	Athlete	Result	Notes	
1	Li Ye	China	2:19.386	QA
2	Viktor Knoch	Hungary	2:19.600	QA
3	Fabio Carta	Italy	2:19.724	QB
4	Apolo Anton Ohno	United States	2:20.346	QB
–	Cees Juffermans	Netherlands	DNF	
–	Pieter Gysel	Belgium	DQ	

=== Finals ===
The six qualifying skaters contested the medal positions in final A, while the six skaters in final B ended up in 6th-11th places.

Final A

Rank	Athlete	Result	Notes
1st place, gold medalist(s)	Ahn Hyun-soo	South Korea	2:25.341
2nd place, silver medalist(s)	Lee Ho-suk	South Korea	2:25.600
3rd place, bronze medalist(s)	Li Jiajun	China	2:26.005
4	Charles Hamelin	Canada	2:26.375
5	Viktor Knoch	Hungary	2:26.806
–	Li Ye	China	DQ

Final B

Rank	Athlete	Result	Notes
6	Mathieu Turcotte	Canada	2:25.341
7	Fabio Carta	Italy	2:24.658
8	Apolo Anton Ohno	United States	2:24.789
9	Satoru Terao	Japan	2:24.875
10	Niels Kerstholt	Netherlands	2:24.962
11	Peter Darazs	Hungary	2:24.969
