= Freestyle skiing at the 2006 Winter Olympics – Men's moguls =

Men's moguls at the XX Olympic Winter Games
- Venue: Sauze d'Oulx
- Dates: 15 February
- Competitors: 35 from 11 nations

Medalists
| 1st place, gold medalist(s) | | Dale Begg-Smith | Australia |
| 2nd place, silver medalist(s) | | Mikko Ronkainen | Finland |
| 3rd place, bronze medalist(s) | | Toby Dawson | United States |

The Men's Moguls event in freestyle skiing at the 2006 Winter Olympics in Turin, Italy took place on 15 February at Sauze d'Oulx.

== Results ==
=== Qualification ===
The qualification round took place on the afternoon of 15 February, with 35 skiers competing. The top 20 advanced to the final.

| Rank | Name | Country | Score | Notes |
|---|---|---|---|---|
| 1 | Dale Begg-Smith | Australia | 25.40 | Q |
| 2 | Travis Cabral | United States | 24.88 | Q |
| 3 | Marc-Andre Moreau | Canada | 24.69 | Q |
| 4 | Jeremy Bloom | United States | 24.51 | Q |
| 5 | Guilbaut Colas | France | 24.33 | Q |
| 6 | Toby Dawson | United States | 24.20 | Q |
| 7 | Travis Mayer | United States | 24.04 | Q |
| 8 | Jesper Bjoernlund | Sweden | 23.97 | Q |
| 9 | Chris Wong | Canada | 23.89 | Q |
| 10 | Janne Lahtela | Finland | 23.77 | Q |
| 11 | Alexandre Bilodeau | Canada | 23.75 | Q |
| 12 | Christoph Stark | Germany | 23.65 | Q |
| 13 | Mikko Ronkainen | Finland | 23.38 | Q |
| 14 | Pierre Ochs | France | 23.19 | Q |
| 15 | Osamu Ueno | Japan | 23.03 | Q |
| 16 | Nick Fisher | Australia | 22.89 | Q |
| 17 | Fredrik Fortkord | Sweden | 22.87 (3.0) | Q |
| 18 | Walter Bormolini | Italy | 22.87 (2.0) | Q |
| 19 | Juuso Lahtela | Finland | 22.31 | Q |
| 20 | Alexandr Smyshlyaev | Russia | 22.18 | Q |
| 21 | Simone Galli | Italy | 21.98 | |
| 22 | Sami Mustonen | Finland | 21.57 | |
| 23 | Per Spett | Sweden | 21.53 | |
| 24 | Michael Robertson | Australia | 21.52 | |
| 25 | Artyom Valinteyev | Russia | 21.51 | |
| 26 | Silvan Palazot | France | 21.29 | |
| 27 | Ruslan Sharifullin | Russia | 21.24 | |
| 28 | Gerhard Blöchl | Germany | 21.16 | |
| 29 | Jason Begg-Smith | Australia | 20.22 | |
| 30 | Kai Ozaki | Japan | 19.7 | |
| 31 | Claudio Bosia | Italy | 19.62 | |
| 32 | Yugo Tsukita | Japan | 19.13 | |
| 33 | Dmitriy Reiherd | Kazakhstan | 18.33 | |
| 34 | Mattia Pegorari | Italy | 16.25 | |
| 35 | Vitali Glushchenko | Russia | 12.75 | |

1: Fortkord and Bormolini were separated by a tiebreaker, with Fortkord winning to place 17th.

=== Final ===
The final took place on the evening of 15 February, with Dale Begg-Smith, the top qualifier and final starter, just beating Mikko Ronkainen for the gold medal.

| Rank | Athlete | Score |
|---|---|---|
| Gold medal | Dale Begg-Smith (AUS) | 26.77 |
| Silver medal | Mikko Ronkainen (FIN) | 26.62 |
| Bronze medal | Toby Dawson (USA) | 26.30 |
| 4 | Marc-Andre Moreau (CAN) | 25.62 |
| 5 | Jesper Bjoernlund (SWE) | 25.21 |
| 6 | Jeremy Bloom (USA) | 25.17 |
| 7 | Travis Mayer (USA) | 24.91 |
| 8 | Juuso Lahtela (FIN) | 24.42 |
| 9 | Travis Cabral (USA) | 24.38 |
| 10 | Guilbaut Colas (FRA) | 23.60 |
| 11 | Alexandre Bilodeau (CAN) | 23.42 |
| 12 | Nick Fisher (AUS) | 23.39 |
| 13 | Alexandr Smyshlyaev (RUS) | 23.22 |
| 14 | Chris Wong (CAN) | 22.88 |
| 15 | Christoph Stark (GER) | 22.84 |
| 16 | Janne Lahtela (FIN) | 22.65 |
| 17 | Pierre Ochs (FRA) | 21.37 |
| 18 | Walter Bormolini (ITA) | 21.36 |
| 19 | Fredrik Fortkord (SWE) | 20.58 |
| 20 | Osamu Ueno (JPN) | 19.54 |
