= Snowboarding at the 2006 Winter Olympics – Men's parallel giant slalom =

Men's parallel giant slalom at the XX Olympic Winter Games
- Venue: Bardonecchia
- Date: 22 February 2006
- Competitors: 36 from 14 nations

Medalists
1st place, gold medalist(s)		Philipp Schoch	Switzerland
2nd place, silver medalist(s)		Simon Schoch	Switzerland
3rd place, bronze medalist(s)		Siegfried Grabner	Austria

The men's parallel giant slalom event in snowboarding at the 2006 Winter Olympics was held in Bardonecchia, a village in the Province of Turin, Italy. The competition took place on 22 February 2006.

== Medalists ==
Gold	Philipp Schoch; Switzerland
Silver	Simon Schoch; Switzerland
Bronze	Siegfried Grabner; Austria

== Qualification ==
The qualification runs started at 10 a.m.(UTC+1)

The athletes were allowed two runs, one on the blue course and one on the red course. The two times were added, and the top 16 snowboarders moved on to the 1/8 finals.

Rank	Bib	Name	Nationality	Blue course (time)	Rank	Red course (time)	Rank	Total time
1	12	Simon Schoch	Switzerland	33.98	1	35.40	5	1:09.38
2	15	Philipp Schoch	Switzerland	35.42	11	34.41	1	1:09.83
3	3	Heinz Inniger	Switzerland	35.51	12	34.45	2	1:09.96
4	2	Andreas Prommegger	Austria	34.37	2	35.98	10	1:10.35
5	4	Gilles Jaquet	Switzerland	34.55	3	35.92	8	1:10.47
6	13	Siegfried Grabner	Austria	35.66	13	34.99	4	1:10.65
7	16	Nicolas Huet	France	34.67	4	36.05	11	1:10.72
8	14	Dejan Kosir	Slovenia	34.84	6	36.22	15	1:11.06
9	8	Tyler Jewell	United States	34.96	7	36.17	14	1:11.13
10	1	Rok Flander	Slovenia	36.38	20	34.80	3	1:11.18
11	6	Richard Richardsson	Sweden	34.76	5	36.70	21	1:11.46
12	22	Roland Fischnaller	Italy	35.15	8	36.46	17	1:11.61
13	5	Mathieu Bozzetto	France	35.38	9	36.64	19	1:12.02
14	10	Harald Walder	Austria	35.40	10	36.71	22	1:12.11
15	21	Emanuel Oppliger	Australia	35.56	24	35.55	6	1:12.11
16	7	Daniel Biveson	Sweden	36.07	14	36.08	12	1:12.15
17	19	Markus Ebner	Germany	36.32	16	35.90	7	1:12.22
18	18	Denis Salagayev	Russia	36.36	18	35.96	8	1:12.32
19	23	Patrick Bussler	Germany	36.42	22	36.12	13	1:12.54
20	11	Jasey Jay Anderson	Canada	36.18	15	35.57	18	1:12.75
21	26	Izidor Sustersic	Slovenia	36.32	16	36.64	19	1:12.96
22	9	Meinhard Erlacher	Italy	36.88	26	36.34	16	1:13.22
23	29	Filip Fischer	Sweden	36.46	23	36.97	23	1:13.43
24	27	Simone Salvati	Italy	36.39	21	37.09	24	1:13.48
25	24	Alexandr Belkin	Russia	36.66	25	37.38	25	1:14.04
26	25	Tomaz Knafelj	Slovenia	36.37	19	38.50	28	1:14.87
27	31	Radoslav Židek	Slovakia	38.30	28	38.21	26	1:16.51
28	30	Kentaro Tsuruoka	Japan	39.71	29	38.43	27	1:18.14
29	20	Philippe Berubé	Canada	36.88	26	53.15	30	1:30.03
30	17	Alexander Maier	Austria	-	DSQ	40.57	29	
-	28	Rudy Galli	Italy	-	DSQ	-	-	

== Elimination round ==
The elimination round started at 1 p.m.(UTC+1)

=== Medal round ===
Round of 16
1	S. Schoch (SUI)
16	Biveson (SWE)	+0.52
8	Kosir (SLO)
9	Jewell (USA)	+0.30
5	Jaquet (SUI)
12	Fischnaller (ITA)	+0.51
4	Prommegger (AUT)	+0.54
13	Bozzetto (FRA)
3	Inniger (SUI)
14	Walder (AUT)	+0.66
6	Grabner (AUT)
11	Richardsson (SWE)	+1.44
7	Huet (FRA)	+0.53
10	Flander (SLO)
2	P. Schoch (SUI)
15	Oppliger (AUS)	+1.37

Quarterfinals
1	S. Schoch (SUI)
8	Kosir (SLO)	+1.27
5	Jaquet (SUI)	+1.54
13	Bozzetto (FRA)
3	Inniger (SUI)	+0.61
6	Grabner (AUT)
10	Flander (SLO)	+1.07
2	P. Schoch (SUI)

Semifinals
1	S. Schoch (SUI)
13	Bozzetto (FRA)	+0.38
6	Grabner (AUT)	+0.34
2	P. Schoch (SUI)

Finals
1	S. Schoch (SUI)	+0.73
2	P. Schoch (SUI)
Third place
13	Bozzetto (FRA)	+0.41
6	Grabner (AUT)

=== Classification 5–8 ===
Placement 5–8
8	Kosir (SLO)
5	Jaquet (SUI)	DSQ
3	Inniger (SUI)
10	Flander (SLO)	+0.14

Placement 5–6
8	Kosir (SLO)	+0.42
3	Inniger (SUI)
Placement 7–8
5	Jaquet (SUI)	+0.41
10	Flander (SLO)
