= Jean Charles Mattei =

French short track speed skater (born 1982)

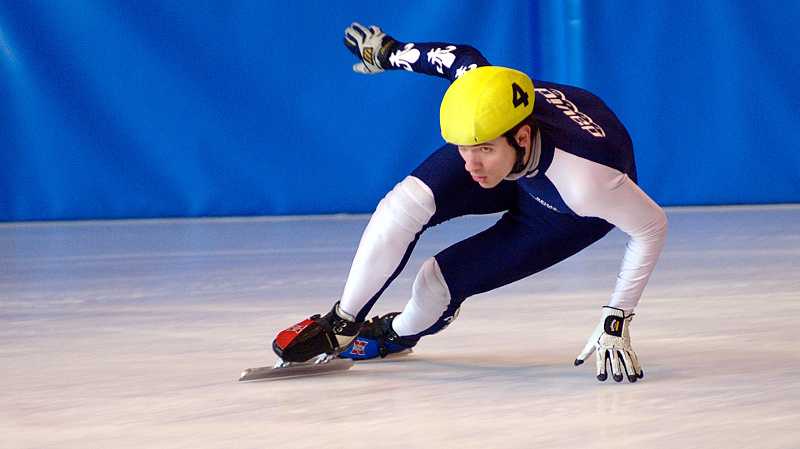

Personal information
- Born: August 1, 1982 (age 43) Reims, France
- Height: 5 ft 10 in (178 cm)
- Weight: 168 lb (76 kg)

Sport
- Country: France
- Sport: Short track speed skating

Achievements and titles
- Olympic finals: 2
- Highest world ranking: 13 (1500m)

Jean Charles Mattei (born August 1, 1982 in Reims) is a French short-track speed-skater.

Mattei competed at the 2006 and 2010 Winter Olympics for France. In 2006, he finished third in his opening heat of the 1000 metres and fifth in his opening heat of the 1500 metres, failing to advance in both. In the 2010 Olympics, he finished fifth in his opening race of the 1500 metres, but was advanced to the semifinals, where he finished seventh, failing to advance.. He was also part of the French 5000 metre relay team, which placed third in the semifinal, but was advanced to the final, where they finished 5th.

As of 2013, Mattei's best performance at the World Championships came as part of the French relay team in 2004, which finished 6th. His best individual performance also came in 2004, in the 1000 metres. He also won a silver medal as a member of the French relay team at the 2006 European Championships.

As of 2013, Mattei has one ISU Short Track Speed Skating World Cup podium finish, a bronze as part of the relay team in 2006-2007 at Heerenveen. His top World Cup ranking is 13th, in the 1500 metres in 2003–04.

== World Cup podiums ==
Date	Season	Location	Rank	Event
4 February 2007	2006–07	Heerenveen	3rd place, bronze medalist(s)	5000m Relay
