= Bormolini =

Bormolini is a surname. Notable people with the surname include:

- Ivan Bormolini (born 1972), Italian alpine skier
- Maurizio Bormolini (born 1994), Italian snowboarder
- Thomas Bormolini (born 1991), Italian biathlete
- Walter Bormolini (born 1986), Italian freestyle skier
