= Vezio Sacratini =

Italian-Canadian ice hockey player

- Born: September 12, 1966 (age 60) Montreal, Quebec, Canada
- Height: 5 ft 8 in (173 cm)
- Weight: 172 lb (78 kg; 12 st 4 lb)
- Position: Centre
- Shot: Left
- Played for: HC Varese; HC Milano; Cardiff Devils; London Knights; HC All Stars Piemonte; Sheffield Steelers
- National team: Italy
- NHL draft: Undrafted
- Playing career: 1988–2008

Vezio Sacratini (born September 12, 1966, in Montreal, Quebec) is a retired Italian-Canadian professional ice hockey player who played for various teams across Europe, most notably the Cardiff Devils, and the Italian national team. Sacratini was a member of the Italian team that finished 9th in the 1994 Winter Olympics.

== Career ==
=== NCAA ===
Sacratini played collegiate hockey for the American International College in what was the ECAC East. Between 1987-1990 Sacratini amassed 49 goals and 114 assists for a total of 163 points in just 70 games. As of June 2017, Sacratini is tied for 4th on the Yellow Jackets all-time assists list and is tied for 9th on the schools all-time scoring list. In addition, Sacratini was named an ECAC All-Star in 1988 and 1989. In 2015, Sacratini was elected to the Yellow Jackets Hall of Fame.

=== Italy ===
After graduating from AIC in 1991, Sacratini began his professional career with Italian outfit HC Varese. His first season in Italy was spent in Serie B. The 1992-93 season saw Sacratini move to the Varese first team where he played in both Serie A and the Alpenliga. This season was difficult for the Mastiffs, finishing 7th in the regular season, out of 9 teams, and losing in the first round of the play-offs to runners up HC Bolzano. Sacratini finished 2nd in the team in scoring, with 26 points in 16 games.

Sacratini remained in Lombardy for the 1993-94 season, where the team were much more competitive. Finishing 3rd out of 11 teams in the regular season, Varese beat HC Alleghe in the quarterfinals, before losing in the semifinals to Bolzano. In regular season play, Sacratini once again finished 2nd in the team in scoring, behind Jan Alston, with 45 points in 26 games, whilst also leading the team in assists, with 33. On top of this, Sacratini also was 2nd in scoring in the Alpenliga with 53 points, behind Dave Pasin of HC Bolzano.

The upward trend continued for the 1994-95 season, in which the Mastiffs finished 2nd overall in the regular season, progressed to the finals of the Serie A playoffs, with wins over HC Alleghe and HC CourmAosta in the quarter and semi-finals respectively. The finals saw them face-off against familiar foe HC Bolzano. The series between the two teams went to the full five games, with Bolzano triumphing, winning the deciding game with a score of 5-2. Sacratini would have his most successful campaign to date, totaling 56 points in 26 regular season games, and a further 20 points in the Alpenliga. This would be Sacratini's last season in Varese, moving at the end of the season to HC Milano.

In his only season in Milan, Sacratini put up 35 points in 26 games during the Serie A regular season, and led the team with 13 points during the Alpenliga. HC Milano finished 2nd in the Serie A regular season, and lost in the play-off finals to HC Bolzano. At the end of the season, Sacratini to Cardiff, Wales to play for the Cardiff Devils in the newly formed British Ice Hockey Superleague.

=== United Kingdom ===
Sacratini had an immediate impact in the Welsh capital, leading the Devils in scoring with 58 points in 39 games, which was good enough to place him second overall in BISL scoring charts, as well as leading the league in assists. Sacratini's good form also resulted in him being named as a BISL Allstar. The Devils were crowned regular season champions, whilst they lost in the semi-finals of the playoffs to the eventual winners, the Sheffield Steelers.

The following season wasn't as productive for Sacratini, tallying 33 points in 37 games during the regular season. He fared better in the Benson & Hedges Cup however, where he was the team's top point scorer. The 1998-99 season was an improvement, with Sacratini scoring 37 points in 40 games as the Devils finished 2nd in the league, and won beat the Nottingham Panthers in the play-off finals.

Cardiff performed poorly in the 1999-00 season, finishing in the penultimate spot in regular season play. Despite this, Sacratini finished joint top point scoring for the Devils, whilst also amassing the most assists. A return of form for the team would be on the cards for the 2000-01 season, as they finished in 2nd place in the regular season, with Sacratini adding 41 points in 48 games. However, at the end of the season the Cardiff Devils went into voluntary liquidation, and as a result were stripped of their BISL franchise. The team would eventually reform and participate in the British National League, which was at the time the second tier of Ice Hockey in the UK. Sacratini, along with Devils teammates Kim Ahlroos, Ian MacIntyre and Steve Thornton would move to the London Knights in preparation for the 2001-02 BISL season.

In addition to his former Devils teammates, when joining the Knights, Sacratini would also be reunited with former Italy and HC Varese teammate Maurizio Mansi. Sacratini would perform admirably on an underperforming Knights team, finishing the season as the team's 4th highest point scorer. The 2002-03 would prove to be a similar affair, with Sacratini being the Knights highest point scoring, whilst the team finished 4th out of 5 teams. The Knights, however, would perform well in the Play-offs, losing 5-3 in the final to the Nottingham Panthers. This, however, would the Knights last season, as the London Arena was sold by team and arena owners Anschutz Entertainment Group. The Knights demise would also coincide with that of the BISL. With the Knights folding, and the Bracknell Bees choosing to drop down a league, the BISL was left with only 3 teams, Belfast Giants, Nottingham Panthers and Sheffield Steelers. Owing a large debt to Ice Hockey UK and facing the prospect of having only three members, the league placed itself into liquidation on 30 April 2003.

The three former BISL teams, along with Basingstoke Bison, Cardiff Devils, Coventry Blaze, London Racers and Manchester Phoenix would go on to form the Elite Ice Hockey League, the new top tier of the sport in the UK. With this development, Sacratini would return to Cardiff and play once again for the Devils. In the inaugural EIHL season, the Devils were a midtable team, finishing 5th, with Sacratini leading the team in both points and assists. The following season would see an improvement from the Devils, finishing the regular season in 3rd spot and making it to the Challenge Cup final. Sacratini would again be a prolific scorer, finishing 2nd in the team's point scoring totals. At the end of the season, Sacratini would be named a First team All-Star. Due to his tenure at the club, as well as being named team captain, the Cardiff Devils held a testimonial match in Sacratini's honour towards the end of the season.

Sacratini returned to Cardiff for the 2005–06 season, leading the team in assists and registering 37 points in 37 games, which tied him in 2nd place on the team. This would Sacratini's last season in the Welsh capital.

=== Further Career and Retirement ===
After leaving the Devils, Sacratini would return to Italy and link up once again with Maurizio Mansi at the Serie A2 club HC All Stars Piemonte, where Mansi was Head Coach. His season in Turin was a triumphant one, leading the league in both points and assists, having scored 70 points in just 30 games. Despite only playing for the All Stars for a single season, Sacratini is highest scoring player in franchise history. Sacratini would also make a fleeting return to the EIHL during the 2006-07 season, playing 5 games for the Sheffield Steelers, registering 5 points.

Sacratini finished his hockey career the following season with Rivière-du-Loup CIMT of the Quebec Senior Central Hockey League, playing in 4 games, tallying 4 points.

Due to the dissolution of the league, Sacratini is the highest point scorer in the history of the BISL (277). In addition, as of June 2017, Sacratini is the 9th highest point scorer Cardiff Devils history (347), and the 7th highest assist scorer (219). Sacratini is also the 4th highest scorer in London Knights History (58).

== Awards ==
- ECAC All Star 1987-88
- ECAC All Star 1988-89
- American International Yellow Jackets Hall of Fame - Class of 2015
- BISL All Star Team 1996-97
- EIHL First Team All-Star 2004-05

== Records ==
- Highest career points in the BISL (277)
- HC All Stars Piemonte franchise record for career points (70)

== Career statistics ==
=== Regular Season and Playoffs ===
			Regular season					Playoffs
Season	Team	League	GP	G	A	Pts	PIM	GP	G	A	Pts	PIM
1988–89	American International College	ECAC-E	—	—	—	—	—	—	—	—	—	—
1991–92	HC Varese	Serie B	—	—	—	—	—	—	—	—	—	—
1992–93	HC Varese	Serie A	16	11	15	26	10	3	2	1	3	4
1993–94	HC Varese	Serie A	26	12	33	45	27	—	—	—	—	—
1994-95	HC Varese	Serie A	45	21	35	56	52	—	—	—	—	—
1995-96	Milano	Serie A	26	11	24	35	24	13	6	10	16	16
1996-97	Cardiff Devils	BISL	39	21	37	58	99	7	4	6	10	8
1997-98	Cardiff Devils	BISL	37	12	21	33	48	8	0	1	1	0
1998-99	Cardiff Devils	BISL	40	17	20	37	30	8	4	2	6	24
1999-00	Cardiff Devils	BISL	42	24	26	50	66	6	3	4	7	16
2000-01	Cardiff Devils	BISL	48	18	23	41	66	6	5	3	8	8
2001-02	London Knights	BISL	45	11	22	33	52	7	4	1	5	8
2002-03	London Knights	BISL	28	9	16	25	16	16	4	10	14	12
2003-04	Cardiff Devils	EIHL	54	14	48	62	104	3	0	3	3	0
2004-05	Cardiff Devils	EIHL	30	11	18	29	44	10	4	3	7	2
2005-06	Cardiff Devils	EIHL	37	11	26	37	14	7	1	4	5	4
2006-07	HC All Stars Piemonte	Serie A2	30	22	48	70	26	4	3	6	9	4
2006-07	Sheffield Steelers	EIHL	5	1	4	5	10	2	1	2	3	32
2007-08	Rivière-du-Loup CIMT	QSCHL	4	1	2	3	2	—	—	—	—	—
BISL totals			279	112	165	227	377	58	24	27	51	76

=== International ===
Year	Team	Event	Result	GP	G	A	Pts	PIM
1994	Italy	Oly	9th	7	0	1	1	10
1994	Italy	WC	6th	5	1	0	1	4
2000	Italy	WC	12th	6	1	1	2	18
2001	Italy	WC	12th	6	1	2	3	8
2002	Italy	WC	15th	6	1	3	4	8
WC totals				23	4	6	10	38
