= Tyler Jewell =

American snowboarder

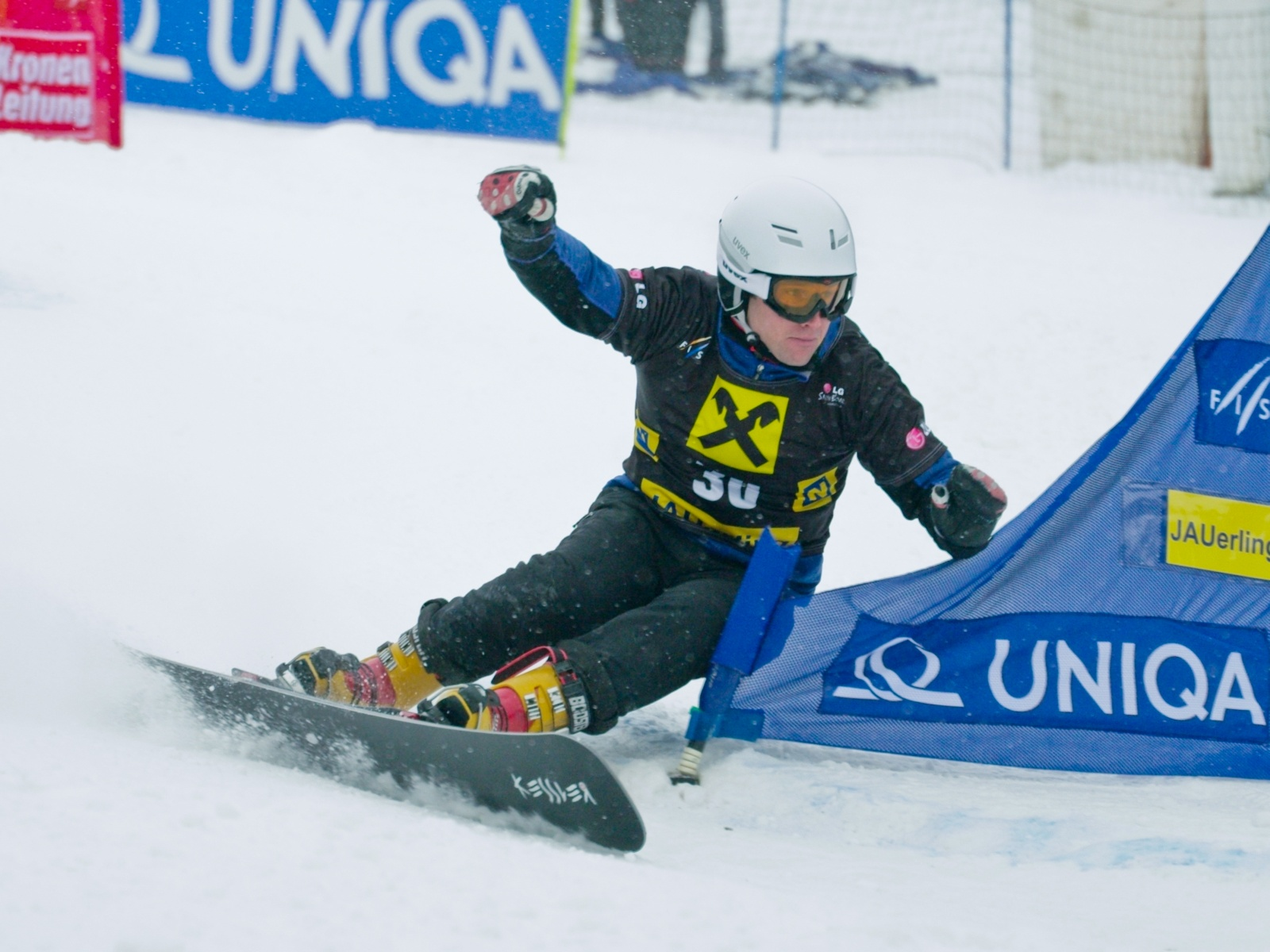
Tyler Jewell (2012)

Tyler Jewell (born February 21, 1977) is an American snowboarder who has competed since 2000. His best World Cup finish was second in the 2008–09 FIS Snowboard World Cup.

At the 2006 Winter Olympics, in Turin, Jewell finished 11th in the parallel giant slalom event. While competing, Jewell wore a red bandana in honor of his late Boston College lacrosse teammate, Welles Crowther, who died during the September 11 attacks in 2001. Crowther, whose signature trait was a red bandana always kept with him since he was six years old, saved the lives of at least a dozen people in the South Tower of the World Trade Center before he died in its collapse.

His best finish at the FIS Snowboard World Championships was sixth in the parallel giant slalom event at Arosa in 2007.

It was announced on 26 January 2010 that Jewell made the US team for the 2010 Winter Olympics.
