= Artyom Valinteyev =

Russian freestyle skier

Personal information
- Nationality: Russian
- Born: 15 October 1983 (age 41); Tomsk, Russia

Sport
- Sport: Freestyle skiing

Artyom Valinteyev (born 15 October 1983) is a Russian freestyle skier. He competed in the men's moguls event at the 2006 Winter Olympics.
