= Travis Cabral =

American freestyle skier

Personal information
- Born: September 23, 1983 (age 42) South Lake Tahoe, California, United States

Sport
- Sport: Freestyle skiing

Travis Cabral (born September 23, 1983) is an American freestyle skier. He competed in the men's moguls event at the 2006 Winter Olympics.

He is a police officer in the South Lake Tahoe Police Department.
