= Filip Fischer =

Swedish snowboarder

Personal information
- Nationality: Swedish
- Born: 8 March 1981 (age 44); Malung, Sweden

Sport
- Sport: Snowboarding

Filip Fischer (born 8 March 1981) is a Swedish snowboarder. He competed in the men's parallel giant slalom event at the 2006 Winter Olympics.
