= Chris Wong (skier) =

Canadian freestyle skier

Chris Wong (born 15 April 1981) is a Canadian free-style skier who competed in moguls and represented Canada at the 2006 Winter Olympic Games.

Wong competed for Canada at the 2006 Winter Olympics in the Men's Mogul event finishing fourteenth. Competing in an event held at Inawashiro, Japan in 2007, Wong suffered a serious knee injury. In 2013, he took a position as assistant coach of the Canadian men's mogul ski team.
