= 2006 Winter Olympics medal table =

2006 Winter Olympics medals
- Location: Turin, Italy

Highlights
- Most gold medals: Germany (11)
- Most total medals: Germany (29)
- Medalling NOCs: 26

2006 Winter Olympic Games Medals map Legend: Gold represents countries that won at least one gold medal Silver represents countries that won at least one silver medal Bronze represents countries that won at least one bronze medal Red represents countries that did not win any medals Grey represents countries that did not participate

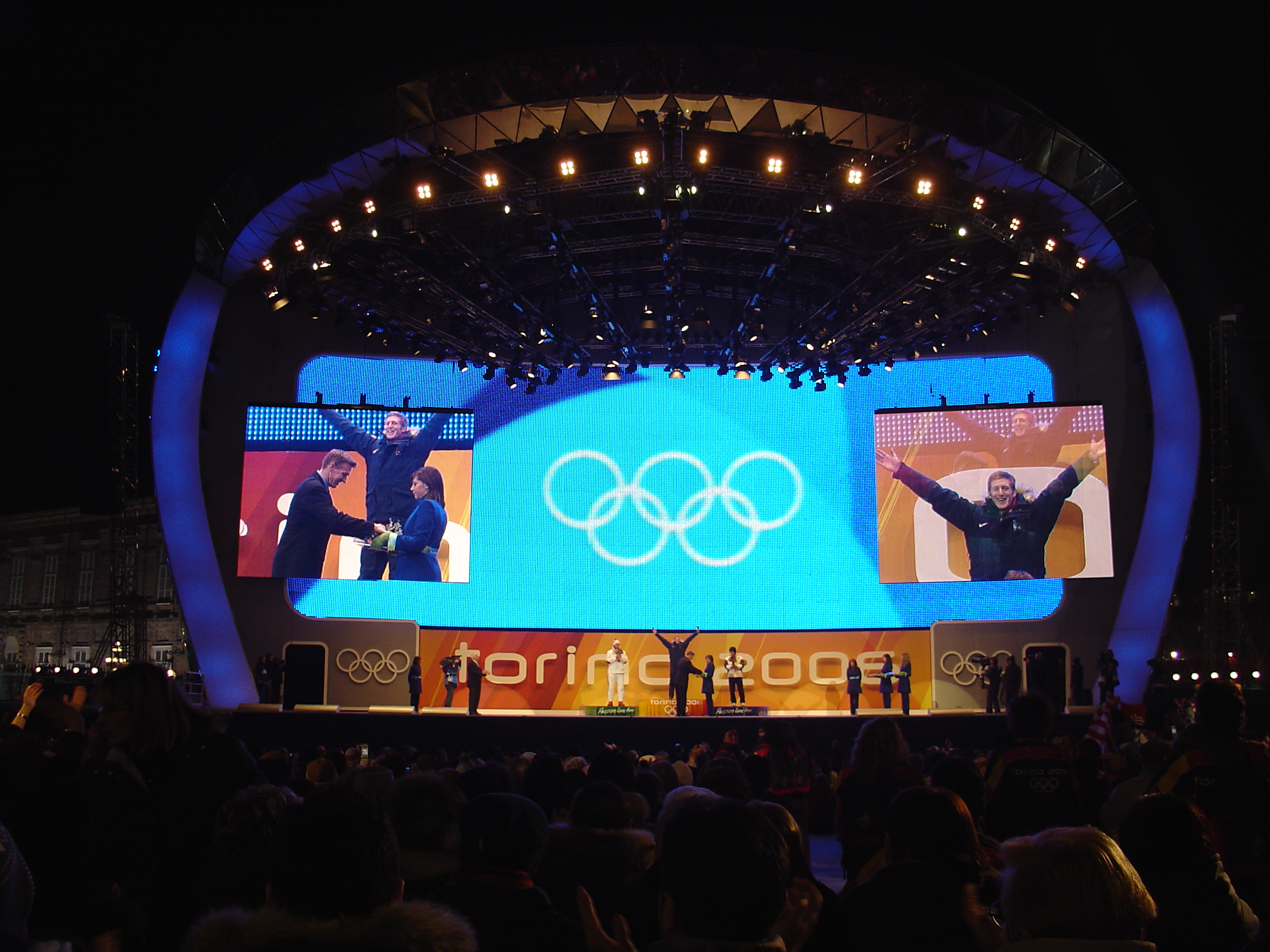
Victory ceremony at Medals Plaza

The 2006 Winter Olympics, officially known as the XX Olympic Winter Games, was a winter multi-sport event held in Turin, Italy, from February 10 to 26, 2006. A total of 2,508 athletes representing 80 National Olympic Committees (NOCs) (+3 from 2002 Olympics) participated in 84 events (+6 from 2002) from 15 different sports and disciplines (unchanged from 2002).

Athletes from 26 NOCs won at least one medal, and athletes from 18 of these NOCs secured at least one gold. Germany won the highest number of gold medals (11) and led in overall medals (29) for the third consecutive Games. Latvia and Slovakia won the first medals in their Winter Olympic history.

Speed skater Cindy Klassen of Canada won five medals (one gold, two silver and two bronze) and was the most medalled athlete at the Games. Biathlete Michael Greis of Germany and short track speed skaters Ahn Hyun Soo and Jin Sun-Yu, both of South Korea, tied for the most gold medals, with three each.

== Changes in medal standings ==
One athlete was stripped of an Olympic medal during these Games. Russian biathlete Olga Pyleva won a silver medal in the 15 km race, but tested positive for carphedon and lost her medal. Germany's Martina Glagow was given the silver medal and fellow Russian Albina Akhatova (who was caught doping in 2009 and missed the 2010 Olympics) won the bronze.

=== IOC retesting ===
The IOC has retested nearly 500 doping samples that were collected at the 2006 Turin Games. In 2014, the Estonian Olympic Committee was notified by the IOC that a retested sample from cross-country skier Kristina Šmigun had tested positive. On October 24, 2016, the World Anti-Doping Agency Athletes' Commission stated that Šmigun, who won two gold medals at the Turin Games, would face a Court of Arbitration for Sport hearing before the end of October. In December 2017, IOC announced that re-analysis of samples resulted in no positive cases.

== Medal table ==
The medal table is based on information provided by the International Olympic Committee (IOC) and is consistent with IOC conventional sorting in its published medal tables. The table uses the Olympic medal table sorting method. By default, the table is ordered by the number of gold medals the athletes from a nation have won, where a nation is an entity represented by a NOC. The number of silver medals is taken into consideration next and then the number of bronze medals. If teams are still tied, equal ranking is given and they are listed alphabetically by their IOC country code.

* Host nation (Italy)

2006 Winter Olympics medal table
Rank	Nation	Gold	Silver	Bronze	Total
1	Germany	11	12	6	29
2	United States	9	9	7	25
3	Austria	9	7	7	23
4	Russia	8	6	8	22
5	Canada	7	10	7	24
6	Sweden	7	2	5	14
7	South Korea	6	3	2	11
8	Switzerland	5	4	5	14
9	Italy*	5	0	6	11
10	France	3	2	4	9
10	Netherlands	3	2	4	9
12	Estonia	3	0	0	3
13	Norway	2	8	9	19
14	China	2	4	5	11
15	Czech Republic	1	2	1	4
16	Croatia	1	2	0	3
17	Australia	1	0	1	2
18	Japan	1	0	0	1
19	Finland	0	6	3	9
20	Poland	0	1	1	2
21	Belarus	0	1	0	1
21	Bulgaria	0	1	0	1
21	Great Britain	0	1	0	1
21	Slovakia	0	1	0	1
25	Ukraine	0	0	2	2
26	Latvia	0	0	1	1
Totals (26 entries)		84	84	84	252

== Change by doping ==
Olympics	Athlete	Country	Medal	Event	Ref
2006 Winter Olympics	Olga Pyleva	Russia	2nd place, silver medalist(s)	Biathlon, Women's individual	

== See also ==
- 2006 Winter Paralympics medal table
- List of 2006 Winter Olympics medal winners
