= Juuso Lahtela =

Finnish freestyle skier

Personal information
- Nationality: Finnish
- Born: 11 June 1985 (age 39); Kemijärvi, Finland

Sport
- Sport: Freestyle skiing

Juuso Lahtela (born 11 June 1985) is a Finnish freestyle skier. He competed in the men's moguls event at the 2006 Winter Olympics.
