= Denis Salagayev =

Russian snowboarder

Personal information
- Nationality: Russian
- Born: 20 October 1979 (age 45); Tashtagol, Russia

Sport
- Sport: Snowboarding

Denis Salagayev (born 20 October 1979) is a Russian snowboarder. He competed in the men's parallel giant slalom event at the 2006 Winter Olympics.
