= Philippe Berubé =

Canadian snowboarder

Philippe Bérubé (born April 6, 1983, in Montreal, Quebec) is a Canadian snowboarder, specializing in the parallel giant slalom event.

Bérubé made his World Cup debut in December 1999 at Mont-Sainte-Anne.

Bérubé's best World Cup season came in 2005, when he placed 45th overall in the parallel snowboarding standings. He has competed at four FIS Snowboarding World Championships, with his best finish a 12th in the parallel slalom in 2005.

Bérubé competed at the 2006 Winter Olympics, in the parallel giant slalom. He placed 29th in the qualifying rounds, which did not allow him to advance.
