= Christoph Stark =

German freestyle skier

Personal information
- Nationality: German
- Born: 12 April 1980 (age 45); Oberstdorf, Germany

Sport
- Sport: Freestyle skiing

Christoph Stark (born 12 April 1980) is a German former freestyle skier. He competed in the men's moguls event at the 2006 Winter Olympics.
