= Péter Darázs =

Hungarian speed skater

Personal information
- Born: 12 October 1985 (age 41) Jászberény, Hungary
- Height: 6 ft 1 in (185 cm)
- Weight: 176 lb (80 kg)

Sport
- Country: Hungary
- Sport: Short track speed skating

Achievements and titles
- Highest world ranking: 11 (Overall)
Medal record
Men's short track speed skating
Representing Hungary
European Championships
Silver medal – second place	2007 Sheffield	5000 m relay
Bronze medal – third place	2009 Turin	5000 m relay

Péter Darázs (born 12 October 1985 in Jászberény) is a Hungarian short track speed skater.

Darázs competed at the 2006 and 2010 Winter Olympics. for Hungary. In 2006, he advanced to the quarterfinals in the 500 and 1000 metre races, but did not advance further from there. In the 1500 metres, he advanced to the B Final, after placing 4th in the semifinal. He placed 6th, last out of the field, in the final, and 11th overall. His best finish in Torino was 10th, in the 500 metres. In the 2010 500 metres, he placed fourth in his round one heat, failing to advance. In the 1500 metres, he placed 3rd in his opening heat, but 7th in the semifinal, failing to advance to the finals. His best overall finish was in the 1500, where he placed 19th.

As of 2013, Darázs's best performance at the World Championships came in 2006, when he placed 12th in the 1500 metres. He has also won two medals as a member of the Hungarian relay team at the European Championships.

As of 2013, Darázs has not finished on the podium on the ISU Short Track Speed Skating World Cup. His top World Cup ranking is 11th, in the overall in 2005–06.
