= Gerhard Blöchl =

German freestyle skier (born 1981)

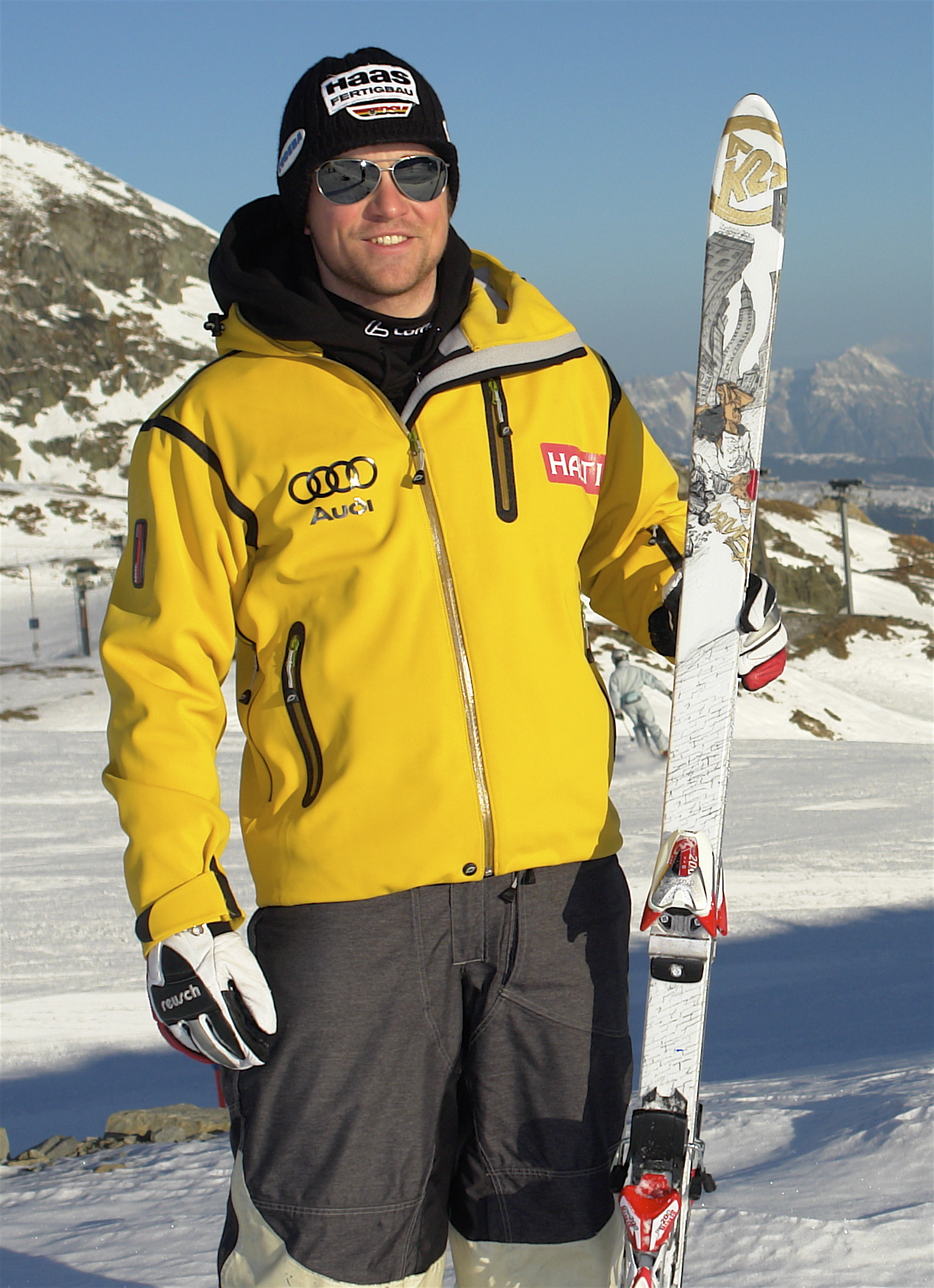
- Gerhard Bloechl in 2007

Personal information
- Nationality: German
- Born: 28 August 1981 (age 43); Eggenfelden, Germany

Sport
- Sport: Freestyle skiing

Gerhard Blöchl (born 28 August 1981) is a German freestyle skier. He competed in the men's moguls event at the 2006 Winter Olympics.
