= Pierre Ochs =

French freestyle skier (born 1984)

Personal information
- Born: 16 December 1984 (age 41) Castres, France

Sport
- Sport: Skiing

World Cup career
- Indiv. podiums: 2
- Updated on 2 March 2013

Pierre Ochs (born 16 December 1984 in Castres) is a French freestyle skier, specializing in moguls.

Ochs competed at the 2006 and 2010 Winter Olympics for France. His best finish was in 2010, where he qualified for the moguls final, and ended up 12th. In 2006, he also qualified for the final, ending up 17th.

As of February 2013, his best showing at the World Championships came in 2007, where he finished 4th in the moguls event, missing out on a podium spot by less than a tenth of a point.

Ochs made his World Cup debut in January 2002. As of February 2013, he has won two World Cup medals, both bronze, with his first at La Plagne in 2008/09. His best World Cup overall finish is 8th, in 2006/07.

== World Cup podiums ==
Date	Location	Rank	Event
18 March 2009	La Plagne	3rd place, bronze medalist(s)	Moguls
18 March 2010	Sierra Nevada	3rd place, bronze medalist(s)	Moguls
