= Silvan Palazot =

French freestyle skier

Personal information
- Nationality: French
- Born: 5 June 1980 (age 44); Thonon-les-Bains, France

Sport
- Sport: Freestyle skiing

Silvan Palazot (born 5 June 1980) is a French freestyle skier. He competed in the men's moguls event at the 2006 Winter Olympics.
