= Alexandr Belkin =

Russian snowboarder (born 1983)

Personal information
- National team: Russia
- Born: 7 January 1983 (age 43) Tashtagol, Russia
- Years active: 2001–2014
- Height: 1.65 m (5 ft 5 in)
- Weight: 68 kg (150 lb)

Sport
- Sport: Snowboarding

Alexandr Belkin (born 7 January 1983) is a Russian former snowboarder. He competed in the men's parallel giant slalom event at the 2006 Winter Olympics, ranking 25th in the tournament.
