= Mike Robertson (rugby union) =

Scotland international rugby union player

- Full name: Michael Alexander Robertson

Rugby union career
- Position: Wing-forward
International career
Years	Team	Apps	(Points)
1958	Scotland	1	(0)

Michael Alexander Robertson is a Scottish former international rugby union player.

Robertson attended Stewart's College in Edinburgh and was a scrum-half in schoolboy rugby. He got switched to wing-forward when he played with Stewart's Melville FP. After moving to Gala, Robertson's form was good enough that he was preferred to Scotland international Adam Robson in the South of Scotland District back-row. He gained his solitary Scotland cap in a 1958 Five Nations match against France at Murrayfield, which they won 11–9.

== See also ==
- List of Scotland national rugby union players
