= Craig Branch =

Australian alpine skier (born 1977)

Personal information
- Nationality: Australia
- Born: 11 February 1977 (age 49)

Sport
- Sport: Alpine skier
- Events: Downhill, Super-G, Alpine Combined

Craig Branch (born 11 February 1977) is an Australian alpine skier. He competed for Australia at the 2002 Olympics, 2006 Olympics and the 2010 Olympics. His best result was 27th place in the super-G at the 2002 Olympics.
