= Mario Chitaroni =

Italian-Canadian ice hockey player

- Born: June 11, 1967 (age 58); Cobalt, Ontario, Canada
- Height: 5 ft 7 in (170 cm)
- Weight: 176 lb (80 kg; 12 st 8 lb)
- Position: Left wing
- Shot: Left
- Played for: New Haven Nighthawks (AHL; Flint Spirits (IHL; Houston Aeros (IHL); HC Alleghe (Serie A); HC Varese (Serie A); Eisbären Berlin (DEL); HC Devils Milano (Serie A)
- National team: Italy
- Playing career: 1986–2009

Mario Brian "Tiger" Chitaroni (born June 11, 1967) is an Italian-Canadian retired professional ice hockey winger. He played major junior with the Sudbury Wolves but went undrafted playing minor pro in the AHL before moving to Italy where he eventually captained their national team.

== International play ==
Mario played in the Olympics in 1998, 2006, and helped Italy try to qualify for 2002 and 2010. Additionally he represented Italy in the World Championships fourteen times, being the captain in 2007 and 2008.

== Career statistics ==
=== Regular season and playoffs ===
			Regular season					Playoffs
Season	Team	League	GP	G	A	Pts	PIM	GP	G	A	Pts	PIM
1982–83	New Liskeard Cubs U18 AAA	GNML
1983–84	New Liskeard Cubs U18 AAA	GNML
1984–85	Sudbury Wolves	OHL	63	18	34	52	108	—	—	—	—	—
1985–86	Sudbury Wolves	OHL	45	20	37	57	127	—	—	—	—	—
1986–87	Flint Spirits	IHL	11	2	12	14	14	6	5	1	6	6
1986–87	Sudbury Wolves	OHL	65	54	48	102	164	—	—	—	—	—
1987–88	Flint Spirits	IHL	80	49	47	96	156	12	8	9	17	60
1988–89	Flint Spirits	IHL	21	10	11	21	59	—	—	—	—	—
1988–89	New Haven Nighthawks	AHL	54	12	24	36	97	16	2	7	9	57
1988–89	Flint Spirits	IHL	21	10	11	21	59	—	—	—	—	—
1989–90	Alleghe Hockey	ITA	36	39	35	74	87	10	14	11	25	29
1990–91	Alleghe Hockey	ITA	31	37	48	85	73	10	12	9	21	10
1991–92	Alleghe Hockey	ITA	18	21	23	44	40	9	3	4	7	16
1991–92	Alleghe Hockey	AL	18	17	20	37	43	—	—	—	—	—
1992–93	Alleghe Hockey	ITA	14	6	12	18	24	9	12	10	22	24
1992–93	Alleghe Hockey	AL	28	21				—	—	—	—	—
1993–94	HC Devils Milano	ITA	23	15	28	43	22	—	—	—	—	—
1994–95	Houston Aeros	IHL	79	24	32	56	157	4	1	3	4	4
1995–96	HC Varese	ITA	32	18	26	44	76	8	7	3	10	36
1996–97	Eisbären Berlin	DEL	48	11	16	27	133	8	2	3	5	10
1997–98	Eisbären Berlin	DEL	42	13	14	27	130	10	3	2	5	64
1998–99	Eisbären Berlin	DEL	46	15	15	30	117	4	0	0	0	26
1999–2000	Eisbären Berlin	DEL	56	14	18	32	134	—	—	—	—	—
2000–01	Nürnberg Ice Tigers	DEL	59	16	19	35	106	4	1	1	2	0
2001–02	Nürnberg Ice Tigers	DEL	54	11	17	28	149	4	0	0	0	4
2002–03	Milano Vipers	ITA	39	23	33	56	66	9	5	5	10	16
2003–04	Milano Vipers	ITA	40	28	36	64	58	12	6	8	14	26
2004–05	Milano Vipers	ITA	28	9	18	27	14	14	5	2	7	35
2005–06	Milano Vipers	ITA	45	13	23	36	62	1	0	1	1	0
2006–07	Milano Vipers	ITA	26	11	10	21	61	8	2	2	4	35
2007–08	Alleghe Hockey	ITA	40	20	23	43	50	4	0	3	3	4
2008–09	Alleghe Hockey	ITA	39	9	27	36	114	5	3	4	7	2
IHL totals			191	85	102	187	386	22	15	12	27	70
ITA totals			411	249	342	591	747	99	69	62	131	233
DEL totals			305	80	99	179	769	30	6	6	12	104

=== International ===
Year	Team	Event	GP	G	A	Pts	PIM
1992	Italy	WC	5	0	0	0	0
1993	Italy	WC	6	1	2	3	4
1994	Italy	WC	6	1	1	2	12
1995	Italy	WC	5	1	1	2	14
1996	Italy	WC	6	3	1	4	4
1997	Italy	WC	8	2	5	7	6
1998	Italy	OG	4	2	0	2	12
1998	Italy	WC	6	3	2	5	16
1999	Italy	WC	3	0	3	3	2
1999	Italy	WC Q	3	3	1	4	14
2000	Italy	OGQ	3	2	3	5	22
2000	Italy	WC	6	1	3	4	12
2001	Italy	WC	5	2	0	2	60
2004	Italy	WC D1	5	4	5	9	2
2005	Italy	WC D1	5	1	4	5	12
2006	Italy	OG	5	0	1	1	6
2007	Italy	WC	6	0	0	0	6
2008	Italy	WC	5	0	1	1	10
2009	Italy	OGQ	3	1	1	2	0
Senior totals			95	27	34	61	214
