= Nick Fisher (skier) =

Australian freestyle skier

Personal information
- Nationality: Australian
- Born: 1 May 1981 (age 43); Adelaide, Australia

Sport
- Sport: Freestyle skiing

Nick Fisher (born 1 May 1981) is an Australian freestyle skier. He competed in the men's moguls event at the 2006 Winter Olympics.
