= Günther Hell =

Italian ice hockey player

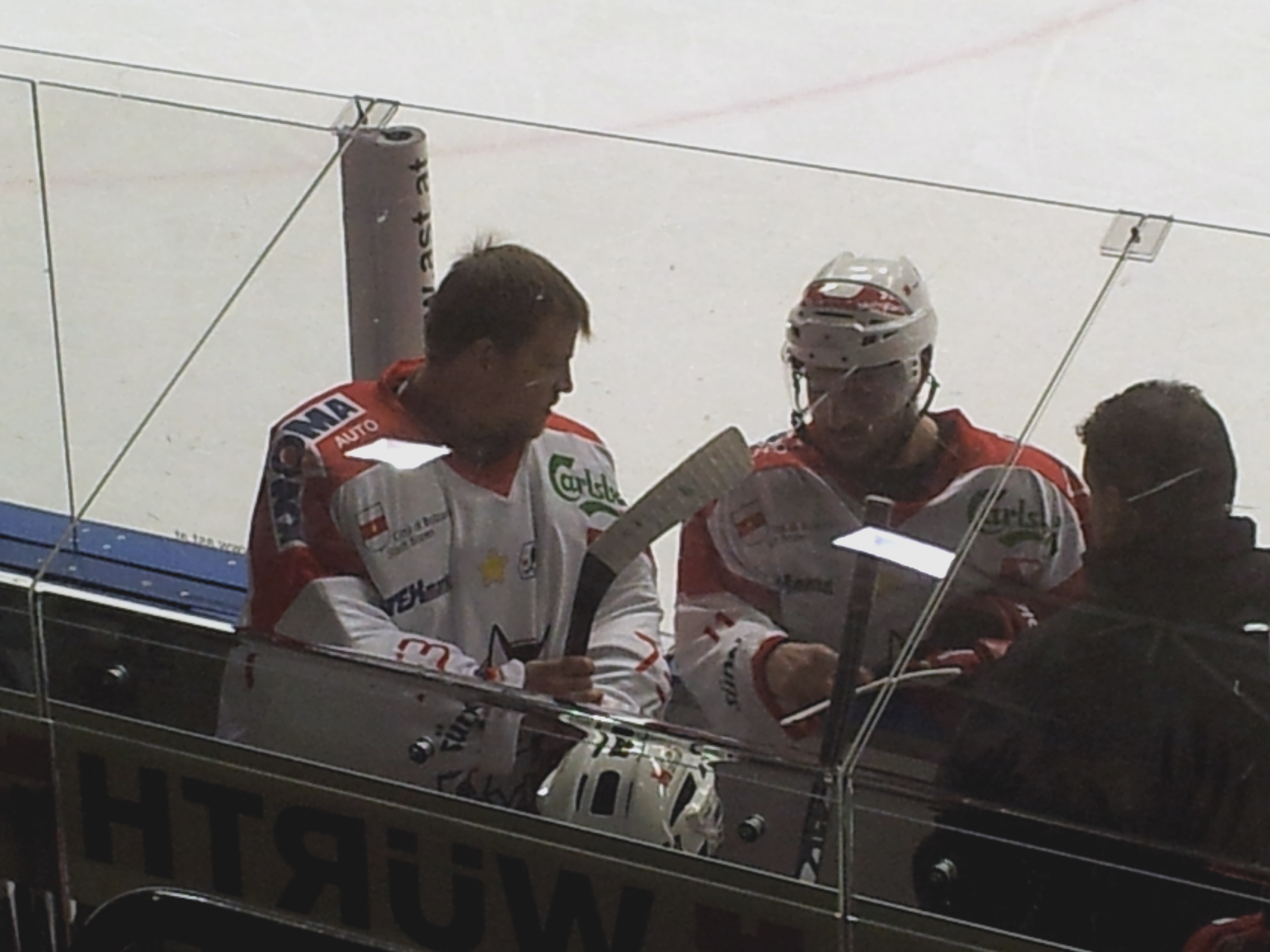
- Günther Hell (left) in 2012

Personal information
- Nationality: Italian
- Born: 30 August 1978 (age 46); Merano, Italy

Sport
- Sport: Ice hockey

Günther Hell (born 30 August 1978) is an Italian ice hockey player. He competed in the men's tournament at the 2006 Winter Olympics.
