= Claudio Bosia =

Italian freestyle skier (born 1983)

Personal information
- Nationality: Italian
- Born: 17 April 1983 (age 41); Sorengo, Switzerland

Sport
- Sport: Freestyle skiing

Claudio Bosia (born 17 April 1983) is an Italian freestyle skier. He competed in the Men's Moguls event at the 2006 Winter Olympics.
