= Mattia Pegorari =

Italian freestyle skier

Personal information
- Nationality: Italian
- Born: 11 September 1983 (age 41); Tirano, Italy

Sport
- Sport: Freestyle skiing

Mattia Pegorari (born 11 September 1983) is an Italian freestyle skier. He competed in the men's moguls event at the 2006 Winter Olympics.
