= Samantha Retrosi =

American luger

Sam Retrosi (born December 12, 1985) is an American luger who competed as at the international level from 2000 to 2007. She competed in the women's singles event at the 2006 Winter Olympics in Turin.

Samantha's previous work focused on the political economy of global sport, during which she wrote a piece for The Nation criticising the Olympic Games as a site of globalized exploitation of athletes and host city residents.
