= Michael Robertson (skier) =

Australian freestyle skier

Personal information
- Nationality: Australian
- Born: 16 June 1982 (age 42); Nathalia, Victoria, Australia

Sport
- Sport: Freestyle skiing

Michael Robertson (born 16 June 1982) is an Australian freestyle skier. He competed in the men's moguls event at the 2006 Winter Olympics.
