= Simone Galli =

Italian freestyle skier

Personal information
- Nationality: Italian
- Born: 24 March 1978 (age 47); Tirano, Italy

Sport
- Sport: Freestyle skiing

Simone Galli (born 24 March 1978) is an Italian freestyle skier. He competed at the 2002 Winter Olympics and the 2006 Winter Olympics.
