= Jason Begg-Smith =

Australian-Canadian freestyle skier (born 1980)

Jason Begg-Smith (born 21 November 1980) is an Australian-Canadian freestyle skier who competed in the 2006 Winter Olympics and Snow Hall of Fame Medal recipient. He finished in 29th place. Born in Vancouver, British Columbia, Canada, he is the older brother of Olympic Gold Medalist Dale Begg-Smith. In 2021 Jason received the prestigious Snow Australian Hall of Fame medal.

Jason Begg-Smith took part in the Turin 2006 Winter Olympics, representing Australia on 15 February 2006. He took 29th place for the Men's Moguls Qualification, finishing at 20.22 seconds.

In 2006 Begg-Smith was ranked top 20 in the world. In only his third year competing in skiing he became the Canadian Jr. National Champion at the age of 16.

His 2004/05 season – his second for Australia – was delayed while he recovered from a separated shoulder injury.

He missed the first two events of the season, returning in January in Lake Placid, New York, and went on to produce a best placing of 26th in Inawashiro. Begg-Smith contested all 12 events on the World Cup in 2003/04, with his best result a 24th in Mont Tremblant. He also posted a 24th in dual moguls in Fernie, British Columbia.

At the young age of 14, Begg-Smith slalom water skied across the frigid waters of the Strait of Juan de Fuca (a distance of 32 nautical miles) on his first try.

The former Canadian represented the country of his birth on the circuit in 2001, with a best performance of 43rd on home snow in Mont Tremblant in January 2001.

With his brother Dale Begg-Smith, he then stood out of World Cup competition for two seasons before taking Australian citizenship and joining the OWI mogul skiing team under the tutelage of Head Coach Steve Desovich. Jason helped coach his younger brother from 2002-2014.

Begg-Smith holds the Caribbean swordfish record at 392 lbs. He caught the record setting fish in a 16-foot aluminum boat on 80 lbs. test fishing line. It took him 14.5 hours to land the catch.
