= HC All Stars Piemonte =

- City: Turin, Italy
- League: Serie A2
- Founded: 2000
- Home arena: Palaghiaccio Tazzoli
- Colours: Blue, White

HC All Stars Piemonte was an ice hockey team in Turin, Italy.

== History ==
The club was created in 2000 by Claudio Gabriele Belforte with the intention of developing young players in the Turin area. In 2006, the team played in the Serie A2, the second level of Italian ice hockey. The club has not participated, and apparently has been defunct, since 2008 (see External links).
