= Emanuel Oppliger =

Australian snowboarder

Emanuel Oppliger (born 23 June 1975) is an Australian snowboarder, competing in the parallel giant slalom. He competed in the 2006 Winter Olympics and placed 5th and 15th in the qualification and elimination run. He made it to the 1/8 finals but lost his match-up and ended up being ranked 15th out of 31 competitors.
