= Hannah Campbell-Pegg =

Australian luger (born 1982)

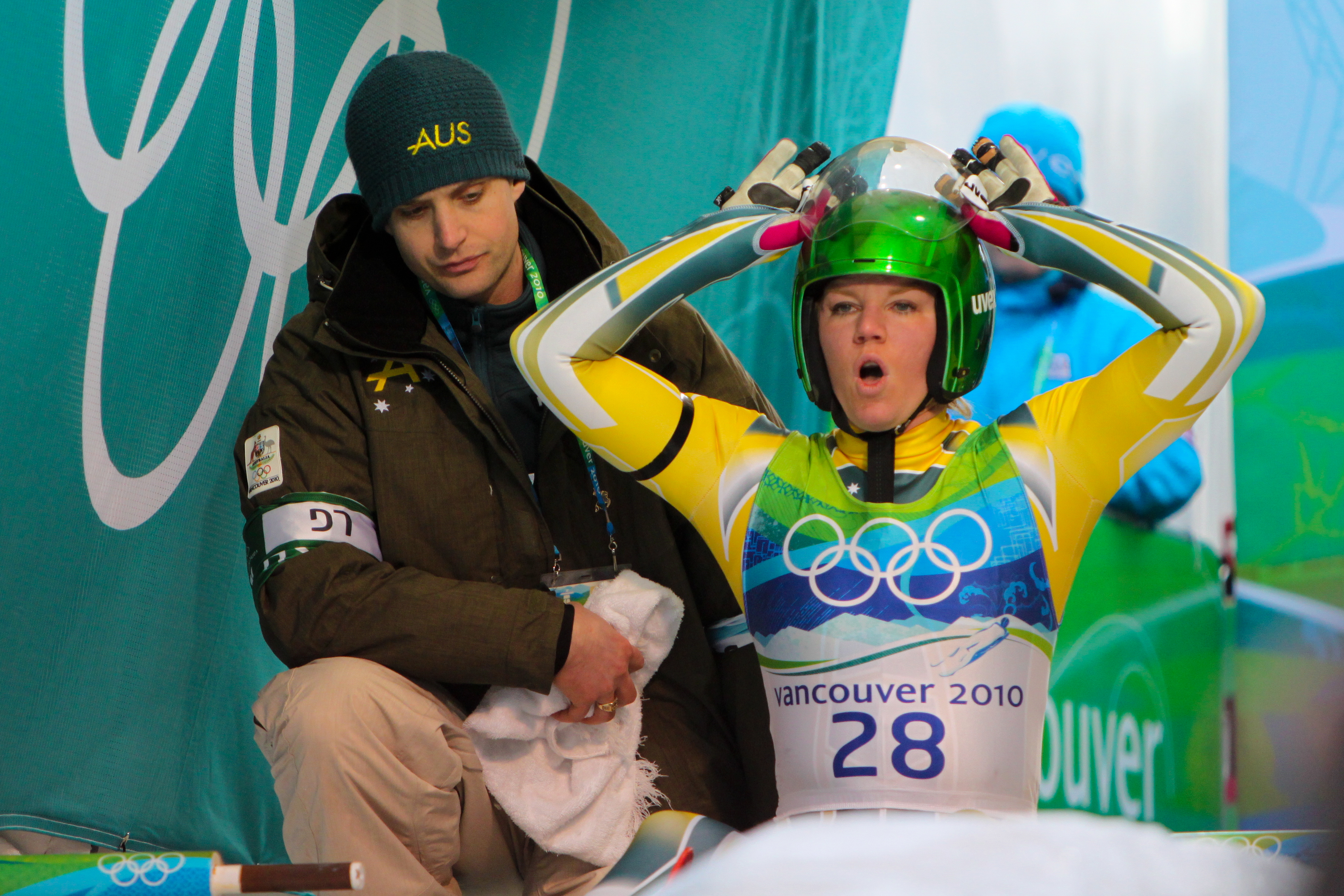
- Campbell-Pegg getting ready for a run during the 2010 Winter Olympics

Personal information
- Born: 24 June 1982 (age 44) Sydney, Australia

Sport
- Country: Australia
- Sport: Luge

Hannah Campbell-Pegg (born 24 June 1982 in Sydney) is an Australian Luge athlete who has competed since 2004. She competed in two Winter Olympics, she finished 23rd in the women's singles event twice (2006, 2010. Campbell-Pegg qualified with little experience in the sport for the 2006 Winter Olympic Games becoming Australia's 3rd athlete to ever do so behind Diane Ogle (1992 Winter Olympic Games Albertville, France) and Roger White (1994 Winter Olympic Games Lillehammer, Norway).

Campbell-Pegg first started her International Sporting career in the Australian Women's Bobsleigh Team in 2002, achieving Bronze in America Cup, Calgary in 2002.

Campbell-Pegg also finished 27th in the women's singles event at the 2008 FIL World Luge Championships in Oberhof, Germany.

Campbell-Pegg lives and trains in Sydney, Australia.

Campbell-Pegg finished 20th in the 2009 Luge World Championships in Lake Placid, USA.
