= Walter Bormolini =

Italian freestyle skier (born 1986)

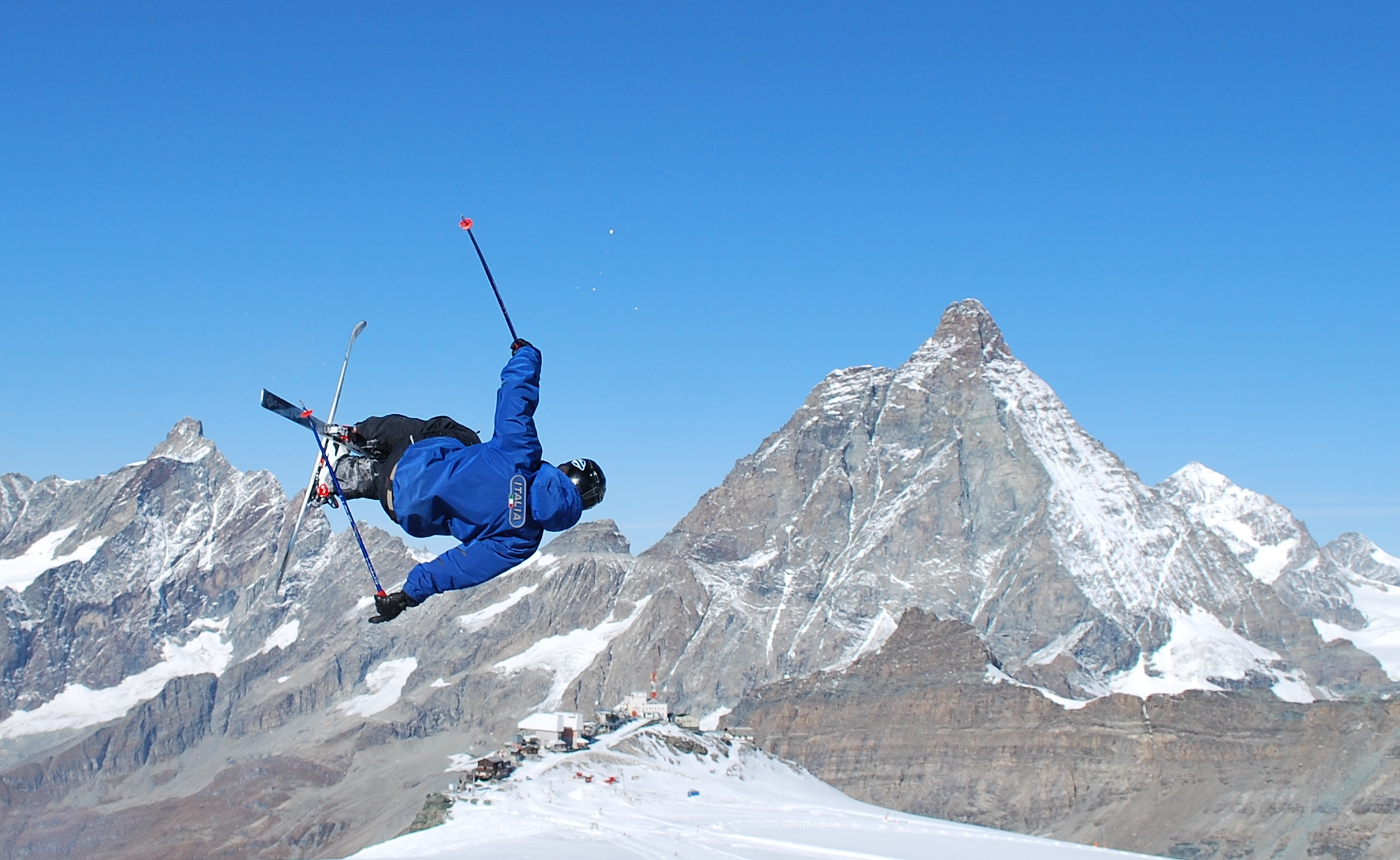

Personal information
- Nationality: Italian
- Born: 26 September 1986 (age 38); Tirano, Italy

Sport
- Sport: Freestyle skiing

Walter Bormolini (born 26 September 1986) is an Italian former freestyle skier. He competed in the men's moguls event at the 2006 Winter Olympics.
