= Sarah Podorieszach =

Canadian-Italian luger (born 1989)

Sarah Podorieszach (born June 5, 1989) is a Canadian-Italian luger who has competed since 2001 and for Italy since 2005. She finished 11th in the women's singles event at the 2006 Winter Olympics in Turin.

Podorieszach started luge at the age of 12 with the Calgary Luge club, winning numerous events in her age class while living and competing in Calgary. She resigned from the Canadian Luge team in September 2004 and began competing for the Italian National Luge team. This was due to Podorieszach's dual Canadian/Italian citizenship.

She finished 22nd in the women's singles event at the 2006 FIL European Luge Championships in Winterberg. At the 2007 FIL World Luge Championships in Igls, Podorieszach finished 20th in the women's singles event.
