= Dariusz Kulesza =

Polish speed skater

Personal information
- Nationality: Polish
- Born: 28 August 1987 (age 37); Białystok, Poland

Sport
- Sport: Short track speed skating

Dariusz Kulesza (born 28 August 1987) is a Polish short track speed skater. He competed in three events at the 2006 Winter Olympics.
