= Mikhail Razhin =

Russian speed skater

Personal information
- Nationality: Russian
- Born: 29 September 1984 (age 40); Moscow, Russia

Sport
- Sport: Short track speed skating

Mikhail Razhin (born 29 September 1984) is a Russian short track speed skater. He competed in three events at the 2006 Winter Olympics.
