= Vyacheslav Kurginyan =

Russian speed skater

Personal information
- Nationality: Russian
- Born: 22 December 1986 (age 39) Ufa, Russia

Sport
- Sport: Short track speed skating
Medal record
World Championships
Silver medal – second place	2013 Debrecen	5000 m relay

Vyacheslav Kurginyan (born 22 December 1986) is a Russian short track speed skater. He competed in three events at the 2006 Winter Olympics.
