= Switzerland at the 2006 Winter Olympics =

- IOC code: SUI
- NOC: Swiss Olympic Association
- Website: www.swissolympic.ch (in German and French)

in Turin
- Competitors: 140 in 13 sports
- Flag bearers: Philipp Schoch (opening); Maya Pedersen-Bieri (closing)
- Medals Ranked 8th: Gold 5 Silver 4 Bronze 5 Total 14

Winter Olympics appearances (overview)
- 1924; 1928; 1932; 1936; 1948; 1952; 1956; 1960; 1964; 1968; 1972; 1976; 1980; 1984; 1988; 1992; 1994; 1998; 2002; 2006; 2010; 2014; 2018; 2022; 2026

Switzerland competed at the 2006 Winter Olympics in Turin, Italy. This was the confederation's largest Winter Olympics team ever, because two ice hockey teams qualified (men and women).

== Medalists ==
Medal	Name	Sport	Event	Date
Gold	Maya Pedersen-Bieri	Skeleton	Women's	16 February
Gold	Tanja Frieden	Snowboarding	Women's snowboard cross	17 February
Gold	Evelyne Leu	Freestyle skiing	Women's aerials	22 February
Gold	Philipp Schoch	Snowboarding	Men's parallel giant slalom	22 February
Gold	Daniela Meuli	Snowboarding	Women's parallel giant slalom	23 February
Silver	Martina Schild	Alpine skiing	Women's downhill	15 February
Silver	Stéphane Lambiel	Figure skating	Men's singles	16 February
Silver	Simon Schoch	Snowboarding	Men's parallel giant slalom	22 February
Silver	Mirjam Ott; Binia Beeli; Valeria Spälty; Michèle Moser; Manuela Kormann	Curling	Women's tournament	23 February
Bronze	Bruno Kernen	Alpine skiing	Men's downhill	12 February
Bronze	Gregor Stähli	Skeleton	Men's	17 February
Bronze	Ambrosi Hoffmann	Alpine skiing	Men's super-G	18 February
Bronze	Martin Annen; Beat Hefti	Bobsleigh	Two-man	19 February
Bronze	Martin Annen; Beat Hefti; Cédric Grand; Thomas Lamparter	Bobsleigh	Four-man	25 February

== Alpine skiing ==
Switzerland won three medals in alpine skiing, with the best performance a silver from Martina Schild in the women's downhill. Bruno Kernen finished 17th in the final men's downhill training run, but improved in the race itself, winning the bronze medal.

Men

Athlete	Event	Final				
Athlete	Event	Run 1	Run 2	Run 3	Total	Rank
Daniel Albrecht	Giant slalom	did not finish				
Daniel Albrecht	Slalom	55.33	did not finish			
Daniel Albrecht	Combined	1:40.47	45.31	44.95	3:10.73	4
Marc Berthod	Giant slalom	1:19.05	1:19.20	n/a	2:38.25	17
Marc Berthod	Slalom	56.22	49.78	n/a	1:46.00	14
Marc Berthod	Combined	1:41.24	45.21	44.77	3:11.22	7
Didier Cuche	Super-G	n/a			1:31.50	12
Didier Cuche	Giant slalom	1:19.08	1:20.25	n/a	2:39.33	19
Didier Défago	Downhill	n/a			1:51.51	26
Didier Défago	Super-G	n/a			1:31.90	16
Didier Défago	Giant slalom	1:18.03	1:19.57	n/a	2:37.60	14
Didier Défago	Combined	1:38.68	did not finish			
Tobias Grünenfelder	Downhill	n/a			1:50.44	12
Ambrosi Hoffmann	Downhill	n/a			1:50.72	17
Ambrosi Hoffmann	Super-G	n/a			1:30.98	Bronze medal
Bruno Kernen	Downhill	n/a			1:49.82	Bronze medal
Bruno Kernen	Super-G	n/a			1:31.95	18
Silvan Zurbriggen	Slalom	55.17	50.93	n/a	1:46.10	15
Silvan Zurbriggen	Combined	1:41.08	did not finish			

Women

Athlete	Event	Final				
Athlete	Event	Run 1	Run 2	Run 3	Total	Rank
Fraenzi Aufdenblatten	Downhill	n/a			1:57.96	12
Fraenzi Aufdenblatten	Super-G	n/a			1:34.10	17
Fraenzi Aufdenblatten	Giant slalom	1:03.46	1:09.16	n/a	2:12.62	16
Fraenzi Aufdenblatten	Combined	41.22	47.23	did not start		
Sylviane Berthod	Downhill	n/a			1:58.36	14
Sylviane Berthod	Super-G	n/a			1:34.00	15
Martina Schild	Downhill	n/a			1:56.86	Silver medal
Martina Schild	Super-G	n/a			1:33.33	6
Nadia Styger	Downhill	n/a			1:57.62	5
Nadia Styger	Super-G	n/a			1:35.57	35
Nadia Styger	Giant slalom	1:01.87	1:12.58	n/a	2:14.45	24

Note: In the men's combined, run 1 is the downhill, and runs 2 and 3 are the slalom. In the women's combined, run 1 and 2 are the slalom, and run 3 the downhill.

== Biathlon ==
Matthias Simmen earned Switzerland's only top 25 finish in Biathlon, as a near-clean shooting performance left him solidly positioned in the men's pursuit.

Athlete	Event	Final		
Athlete	Event	Time	Misses	Rank
Simon Hallenbarter	Men's sprint	30:05.7	5	66
Simon Hallenbarter	Men's individual	1:04:37.0	8	76
Matthias Simmen	Men's sprint	28:56.3	3	45
Matthias Simmen	Men's pursuit	38:08.85	4	23
Matthias Simmen	Men's individual	1:01:04.9	5	52

== Bobsleigh ==
Martin Annen piloted the Switzerland-1 sled in the two-man and the four-man, and in both events won a bronze medal. In each case, his team fell behind on the third run, but then performed well on the final run to earn a medal.

Athlete	Event	Final					
Athlete	Event	Run 1	Run 2	Run 3	Run 4	Total	Rank
Martin Annen; Beat Hefti	Two-man	55.54	55.67	56.18	56.34	3:43.73	Bronze medal
Ivo Rüegg; Cédric Grand	Two-man	55.85	55.74	56.37	56.90	3:44.86	8
Maya Bamert; Martina Feusi	Two-woman	57.72	57.78	58.00	58.54	3:52.04	8
Sabina Hafner; Cora Huber	Two-woman	57.86	57.92	58.73	58.35	3:52.86	10
Martin Annen; Beat Hefti; Thomas Lamparter; Cédric Grand	Four-man	55.26	55.37	55.00	55.20	3:40.83	Bronze medal
Ivo Rüegg; Andy Gees; Roman Handschin; Christian Aebli	Four-man	55.65	55.63	55.22	55.30	3:41.80	8

== Cross-country skiing ==
The Swiss cross-country team had only a single top-10 finish, a 7th place from the men's relay. The women's relay team, which earned a bronze medal in Salt Lake City, finished 11th.

Distance

Athlete	Event	Final	
Athlete	Event	Total	Rank
Seraina Boner	Women's 10 km classical	30:58.0	41
Reto Burgermeister	Men's 30 km pursuit	1:25:49.9	59
Remo Fischer	Men's 30 km pursuit	1:20:19.7	36
Remo Fischer	Men's 50 km freestyle	2:06:40.9	21
Natascia Leonardi Cortesi	Women's 15 km pursuit	45:34.3	24
Natascia Leonardi Cortesi	Women's 30 km freestyle	1:25:32.0	16
Toni Livers	Men's 30 km pursuit	1:21:08.2	40
Toni Livers	Men's 50 km freestyle	2:07:25.4	32
Seraina Mischol	Women's 10 km classical	29:30.4	15
Laurence Rochat	Women's 10 km classical	30:02.2	25
Christian Stebler	Men's 15 km classical	40:38.6	29
Christian Stebler	Men's 50 km freestyle	2:11:13.0	50
Reto Burgermeister; Christian Stebler; Toni Livers; Remo Fischer	Men's 4 x 10 km relay	1:45:10.9	7
Seraina Mischol; Laurence Rochat; Natascia Leonardi Cortesi; Seraina Boner	Women's 4 x 5 km relay	56:52.4	11

Sprint

Athlete	Event	Qualifying		Quarterfinal		Semifinal		Final	
Athlete	Event	Total	Rank	Total	Rank	Total	Rank	Total	Rank
Christoph Eigenmann	Men's sprint	2:20.46	30 Q	2:25.6	6	Did not advance			30
Seraina Mischol	Women's sprint	2:18.83	32	Did not advance					32
Laurence Rochat	Women's sprint	2:17.73	26 Q	2:18.9	3	Did not advance			15
Reto Burgermeister; Christoph Eigenmann	Men's team sprint	n/a				18:00.6	8	Did not advance	15

== Curling ==
In the men's event, 2006 European champion Ralph Stöckli finished the round robin at 5 wins, one short of the mark needed to progress to the medal round. On the women's side, Mirjam Ott, who won a silver medal as a third in 2002, made the final in 2006 as well, this time as a skip. Her rink finished second in the round robin before beating Canada in the semifinals. In the final, the Swiss managed to tie the game in the 10th end, forcing an extra, but Swedish skip Anette Norberg made a difficult shot to leave the Swiss with silver again.

=== Men's tournament ===
Team: Ralph Stöckli (skip), Claudio Pescia, Pascal Sieber, Simon Strübin, Marco Battilana (alternate)

Round Robin
Draw 1

Team	1	2	3	4	5	6	7	8	9	10	Final
Finland (Uusipaavalniemi)	0	1	0	1	0	0	0	0	0	X	2
Switzerland (Stöckli) 🔨	2	0	1	0	0	1	2	0	1	X	7

;Draw 3

Team	1	2	3	4	5	6	7	8	9	10	Final
Norway (Trulsen)	0	0	0	0	1	0	0	3	3	X	5
Switzerland (Stöckli) 🔨	0	0	0	1	0	1	0	0	0	X	2

;Draw 5

Team	1	2	3	4	5	6	7	8	9	10	Final
Canada (Gushue) 🔨	1	0	0	1	1	1	1	1	0	1	7
Switzerland (Stöckli)	0	1	3	0	0	0	0	0	1	0	5

;Draw 6

Team	1	2	3	4	5	6	7	8	9	10	Final
Switzerland (Stöckli) 🔨	2	0	0	0	2	0	1	3	0	1	9
New Zealand (Becker)	0	2	0	1	0	2	0	0	2	0	7

;Draw 7

Team	1	2	3	4	5	6	7	8	9	10	Final
Switzerland (Stöckli)	2	0	0	0	0	2	0	0	4	0	8
Germany (Kapp) 🔨	0	0	0	1	1	0	1	0	0	1	5

;Draw 8

Team	1	2	3	4	5	6	7	8	9	10	Final
United States (Fenson) 🔨	0	0	2	0	0	1	1	0	2	1	7
Switzerland (Stöckli)	0	0	0	0	1	0	0	2	0	0	3

;Draw 9

Team	1	2	3	4	5	6	7	8	9	10	Final
Switzerland (Stöckli) 🔨	2	0	0	0	0	0	1	2	0	0	5
Great Britain (Murdoch)	0	1	1	0	1	0	0	0	2	1	6

;Draw 11

Team	1	2	3	4	5	6	7	8	9	10	Final
Sweden (Lindholm) 🔨	0	0	2	0	0	1	0	0	0	X	3
Switzerland (Stöckli)	0	1	0	0	2	0	1	3	1	X	8

;Draw 12

Team	1	2	3	4	5	6	7	8	9	10	Final
Switzerland (Stöckli) 🔨	4	0	1	0	3	2	X	X	X	X	10
Italy (Retornaz)	0	1	0	1	0	0	X	X	X	X	2

Standings

Rank	Team	Skip	Won	Lost
1	Finland	Markku Uusipaavalniemi	7	2
2	Canada	Brad Gushue	6	3
3	United States	Pete Fenson	6	3
4	Great Britain	David Murdoch	6	3
5	Norway	Pål Trulsen	5	4
6	Switzerland	Ralph Stockli	5	4
7	Italy	Joel Retornaz	4	5
8	Sweden	Peter Lindholm	3	6
9	Germany	Andy Kapp	3	6
10	New Zealand	Sean Becker	0	9

=== Women's tournament ===
: Mirjam Ott (skip), Binia Beeli, Valeria Spälty, Michèle Moser, Manuela Kormann (alternate)

Round Robin
Draw 1

Team	1	2	3	4	5	6	7	8	9	10	Final
Switzerland (Ott)	0	0	4	0	2	0	3	2	X	X	11
Italy (Gaspari) 🔨	1	0	0	2	0	1	0	0	X	X	4

;Draw 2

Team	1	2	3	4	5	6	7	8	9	10	Final
Switzerland (Ott)	0	0	0	2	1	0	1	0	0	0	4
Great Britain (Martin) 🔨	0	0	2	0	0	1	0	1	0	1	5

;Draw 3

Team	1	2	3	4	5	6	7	8	9	10	Final
Norway (Nordby)	0	1	0	0	0	1	0	X	X	X	6
Switzerland (Ott) 🔨	2	0	1	1	1	0	4	X	X	X	5

;Draw 5

Team	1	2	3	4	5	6	7	8	9	10	Final
Canada (Kleibrink) 🔨	0	1	0	0	2	0	1	0	1	0	5
Switzerland (Ott)	0	0	0	3	0	0	0	2	0	1	6

;Draw 6

Team	1	2	3	4	5	6	7	8	9	10	Final
Denmark (Holm)	0	0	1	1	0	0	0	X	X	X	2
Switzerland (Ott) 🔨	0	3	0	0	1	3	3	X	X	X	10

;Draw 7

Team	1	2	3	4	5	6	7	8	9	10	Final
Switzerland (Ott)	2	0	1	0	0	1	0	2	0	1	7
Sweden (Norberg) 🔨	0	1	0	2	0	0	2	0	4	0	9

;Draw 8

Team	1	2	3	4	5	6	7	8	9	10	Final
Russia (Privivkova)	0	0	1	0	1	0	0	1	0	1	4
Switzerland (Ott) 🔨	1	2	0	1	0	0	3	0	0	0	7

;Draw 10

Team	1	2	3	4	5	6	7	8	9	10	Final
Switzerland (Ott)	0	2	2	0	0	1	0	1	0	3	9
United States (Johnson) 🔨	2	0	0	1	2	0	2	0	1	0	8

;Draw 12

Team	1	2	3	4	5	6	7	8	9	10	Final
Switzerland (Ott) 🔨	1	2	0	4	0	0	0	4	X	X	11
Japan (Onodera)	0	0	2	0	1	1	1	0	X	X	5

Standings

Rank	Team	Skip	Won	Lost
1	Sweden	Anette Norberg	7	2
2	Switzerland	Mirjam Ott	7	2
3	Canada	Shannon Kleibrink	6	3
4	Norway	Dordi Nordby	6	3
5	Great Britain	Rhona Martin	5	4
6	Russia	Ludmila Privivkova	5	4
7	Japan	Ayumi Onodera	4	5
8	Denmark	Dorthe Holm	2	7
9	United States	Cassandra Johnson	2	7
10	Italy	Diana Gaspari	1	8

Playoffs
Semifinal

Team	1	2	3	4	5	6	7	8	9	10	11	Final
Switzerland (Ott)	0	0	3	0	1	1	0	2	0	0	-	7
Canada (Kleibrink) 🔨	0	1	0	1	0	0	2	0	1	0	-	5

;Final

Team	1	2	3	4	5	6	7	8	9	10	11	Final
Sweden (Norberg) 🔨	0	2	0	1	0	1	1	0	1	0	1	7
Switzerland (Ott)	0	0	2	0	0	0	0	2	0	2	0	6

Key: The hammer indicates which team had the last stone in the first end.

== Figure skating ==
2005 World champion Stéphane Lambiel was one of the few medal challengers to have two consistent performances, and his 4th-placed free skate and 3rd-placed short program were good enough to earn him a silver medal.

Athlete	Event	CD		SP/OD		FS/FD		Total	
Athlete	Event	Points	Rank	Points	Rank	Points	Rank	Points	Rank
Stéphane Lambiel	Men's	n/a		79.04	3 Q	152.17	4	231.21	Silver medal
Sarah Meier	Ladies'	n/a		55.57	10 Q	100.56	8	156.13	8
Jamal Othman	Men's	n/a		52.18	27	did not advance			27

Key: CD = Compulsory Dance, FD = Free Dance, FS = Free Skate, OD = Original Dance, SP = Short Program

== Freestyle skiing ==
2005 World Championships silver medalist Evelyne Leu sat 5th after the first jump in the |women's aerials final, but on her second jump, she put up the highest score of the competition, earning her a gold medal.

Athlete	Event	Qualifying		Final	
Athlete	Event	Points	Rank	Points	Rank
Thomas Lambert	Men's aerials	214.77	14	did not advance	14
Evelyne Leu	Women's aerials	180.37	4 Q	202.55	Gold medal
Manuela Müller	Women's aerials	168.31	9 Q	159.14	7
Renato Ulrich	Men's aerials	225.75	11 Q	204.75	11

== Ice hockey ==
The Swiss men's team had the two biggest upsets of the Olympic ice hockey tournament, beating the 1998 and 2002 gold medalists, the Czech Republic and Canada in back-to-back games. The win against Canada was the first time the Swiss had beaten that nation in an international competition, and required a stellar goaltending show from Martin Gerber, who earned a shutout. The team made the medal round, but lost in the quarter-finals to eventual champions Sweden. The women's team was less successful, losing each of its first four games before eventually finishing 7th.

=== Men's tournament ===
Players

The following is the Swiss roster for the men's ice hockey tournament at the 2006 Winter Olympics.

Head coach: (Canada) / (Germany) Ralph Krueger

Assistant coaches: Jakob Kölliker, (Canada) Peter John Lee

No.	Pos.	Name	Height	Weight	Birthdate	Team
3	D	Julien Vauclair	6 ft 0 in (183 cm)	203 lb (92 kg)	October 2, 1979 (aged 26)	(Switzerland) HC Lugano
4	F	Flavien Conne	5 ft 10 in (178 cm)	179 lb (81 kg)	April 10, 1980 (aged 25)	(Switzerland) HC Lugano
5	D	Severin Blindenbacher	5 ft 11 in (180 cm)	190 lb (86 kg)	March 15, 1983 (aged 22)	(Switzerland) ZSC Lions
7	D	Mark Streit (C)	5 ft 11 in (180 cm)	192 lb (87 kg)	December 11, 1977 (aged 28)	(Canada) Montreal Canadiens
10	F	Andres Ambühl^{1}	5 ft 9 in (175 cm)	190 lb (86 kg)	September 14, 1983 (aged 22)	(Switzerland) HC Davos
12	F	Patric Della Rossa	6 ft 2 in (188 cm)	203 lb (92 kg)	July 28, 1975 (aged 30)	(Switzerland) EV Zug
15	F	Paul DiPietro (A)	5 ft 9 in (175 cm)	181 lb (82 kg)	September 8, 1970 (aged 35)	(Switzerland) EV Zug
21	F	Patrick Fischer	5 ft 11 in (180 cm)	187 lb (85 kg)	October 6, 1975 (aged 30)	(Switzerland) EV Zug
22	D	Olivier Keller	6 ft 2 in (188 cm)	207 lb (94 kg)	March 20, 1971 (aged 34)	(Switzerland) EHC Basel
23	F	Thierry Paterlini	6 ft 1 in (185 cm)	205 lb (93 kg)	April 27, 1975 (aged 30)	(Switzerland) ZSC Lions
26	G	Martin Gerber	5 ft 11 in (180 cm)	207 lb (94 kg)	October 3, 1974 (aged 31)	(United States) Carolina Hurricanes
28	F	Martin Plüss	5 ft 9 in (175 cm)	170 lb (77 kg)	April 5, 1977 (aged 28)	(Sweden) Frölunda HC
29	D	Beat Forster	6 ft 1 in (185 cm)	218 lb (99 kg)	February 2, 1982 (aged 20)	(Switzerland) ZSC Lions
31	D	Mathias Seger	5 ft 11 in (180 cm)	190 lb (86 kg)	December 17, 1977 (aged 28)	(Switzerland) ZSC Lions
32	F	Ivo Rüthemann (A)	5 ft 8 in (173 cm)	174 lb (79 kg)	December 12, 1976 (aged 29)	(Switzerland) SC Bern
33	D	Steve Hirschi	5 ft 10 in (178 cm)	192 lb (87 kg)	September 18, 1981 (aged 24)	(Switzerland) HC Lugano
35	F	Sandy Jeannin	5 ft 11 in (180 cm)	183 lb (83 kg)	February 28, 1976 (aged 29)	(Switzerland) HC Lugano
38	F	Marcel Jenni	5 ft 11 in (180 cm)	194 lb (88 kg)	March 2, 1974 (aged 31)	(Switzerland) Kloten Flyers
38	F	Thomas Ziegler	5 ft 11 in (180 cm)	190 lb (86 kg)	June 9, 1978 (aged 27)	(Switzerland) SC Bern
40	G	David Aebischer	6 ft 1 in (185 cm)	187 lb (85 kg)	February 7, 1978 (aged 28)	(United States) Colorado Avalanche
44	G	Marco Bührer	5 ft 10 in (178 cm)	181 lb (82 kg)	October 9, 1979 (aged 26)	(Switzerland) SC Bern
57	D	Goran Bezina	6 ft 3 in (191 cm)	220 lb (100 kg)	March 21, 1980 (aged 25)	(Switzerland) Genève-Servette HC
67	F	Romano Lemm	6 ft 0 in (183 cm)	194 lb (88 kg)	June 25, 1984 (aged 21)	(Switzerland) Kloten Flyers
97	F	Adrian Wichser	5 ft 11 in (180 cm)	187 lb (85 kg)	March 18, 1980 (aged 25)	(Switzerland) ZSC Lions

- ^{1} Andres Ambühl replaced Thomas Ziegler on the team roster after the first five games of the tournament.

Round-robin

Pos	Team	Pld	W	D	L	GF	GA	GD	Pts	Qualification
1	Finland	5	5	0	0	19	2	+17	10	Quarterfinals
2	Switzerland	5	2	2	1	10	12	−2	6	Quarterfinals
3	Canada	5	3	0	2	15	9	+6	6	Quarterfinals
4	Czech Republic	5	2	0	3	14	12	+2	4	Quarterfinals
5	Germany	5	0	2	3	7	16	−9	2	
6	Italy (H)	5	0	2	3	9	23	−14	2	

Source: IIHF
(H) Hosts

15 February 2006; 15:35	Switzerland	0–5 (0–1, 0–4, 0–0)	Finland	Torino Esposizioni, Turin; Attendance: 2,960

Game reference

Martin Gerber (out 40:00)
David Aebischer (in 40:00)
Goalies
Antero Niittymäki
Referee:
(Canada) Don Van Massenhoven
Linesmen:
(Sweden) Joacim Karlsson
(United States) Thor Nelson

0–1	13:07 – O. Jokinen (V. Peltonen) (PP)
0–2	23:35 – T. Numminen (T. Selänne, J. Lehtinen) (PP)
0–3	28:04 – O. Jokinen (V. Peltonen, J. Jokinen) (PP)
0–4	33:25 – T. Selänne (S. Koivu)
0–5	39:25 – T. Selänne (J. Lehtinen, O. Jokinen)

10 min
Penalties
8 min
24
Shots
37

16 February 2006; 13:05	Czech Republic	2–3 (0–1, 1–1, 1–1)	Switzerland	Torino Esposizioni, Turin; Attendance: 3,400

Game reference

Tomáš Vokoun
Goalies
David Aebischer
Referee:
(United States) Dennis LaRue
Linesmen:
(United States) Tony Sericolo
(Russia) Sergei Shelyanin

	0–1	5:11 – T. Ziegler (I. Rüthemann)
J. Jágr (M. Straka, V. Prospal) – 22:55	1–1
	1–2	29:44 – T. Paterlini (SH)
M. Židlický (A. Hemský, M. Ručinský) – 41:00	2–2
	2–3	46:42 – M. Streit (M. Seger, M. Plüss) (PP)

14 min
Penalties
20 min
42
Shots
19

18 February 2006; 15:35	Canada	0–2 (0–1, 0–1, 0–0)	Switzerland	Torino Esposizioni, Turin; Attendance: 4,769

Game reference
Martin Brodeur	Goalies	Martin Gerber	Referee: (Russia) Vyacheslav Bulanov; Linesmen: (Slovakia) Miroslav Halecký (United States) Kevin Redding
0–1 / 18:19 – P. DiPietro (P. Della Rossa); 0–2 / 28:47 – P. DiPietro (G. Bezina, M. Streit) (PP2)			Referee: (Russia) Vyacheslav Bulanov; Linesmen: (Slovakia) Miroslav Halecký (United States) Kevin Redding
34 min	Penalties	42 min	Referee: (Russia) Vyacheslav Bulanov; Linesmen: (Slovakia) Miroslav Halecký (United States) Kevin Redding
49	Shots	18	Referee: (Russia) Vyacheslav Bulanov; Linesmen: (Slovakia) Miroslav Halecký (United States) Kevin Redding

19 February 2006; 12:05	Germany	2–2 (0–0, 1–2, 1–0)	Switzerland	Palasport Olimpico, Turin; Attendance: 8,756

Game reference

Olaf Kölzig
Goalies
David Aebischer
Referee:
(Canada) Don Van Massenhoven
Linesmen:
(United States) Kevin Redding
(Russia) Sergei Shelyanin

S. Felski (C. Ehrhoff) – 22:20	1–0
	1–1	28:17 – F. Conne (P. Fischer)
	1–2	38:05 – P. DiPietro (P. Della Rossa)
T. Boos (E. Lewandowski) – 52:09	2–2

8 min
Penalties
8 min
28
Shots
25

21 February 2006; 12:35	Switzerland	3–3 (2–1, 0–1, 1–1)	Italy	Palasport Olimpico, Turin; Attendance: 8,529

Game reference

David Aebischer
Goalies
Jason Muzzatti
Referee:
(United States) Dennis LaRue
Linesmen:
(Slovakia) Milan Mášik
(United States) Tony Sericolo

R. Lemm (G. Bezina, S. Blindenbacher) (PP) − 3:06	1–0
P. Fischer (M. Plüss) – 6:33	2–0
	2–1	15:41 – J. Busillo (B. Nardella) (PP)
	2–2	20:53 – C. Trevisani (J. Cirone, J. Busillo) (PP)
	2–3	46:13 – T. Iob (G. de Bettin)
I. Rüthemann – 56:38	3–3

14 min
Penalties
10 min
25
Shots
35

Medal round

Quarterfinal

22 February 2006; 16:35	Switzerland	2–6 (1–2, 0–3, 1–1)	Sweden	Torino Esposizioni, Turin; Attendance: 2,970

Game reference

Martin Gerber
Goalies
Henrik Lundqvist
Referee:
(Canada) Dan Marouelli
Linesmen:
(United States) Thor Nelson
(Russia) Sergei Shelyanin

	0–1	3:05 – H. Sedin (D. Sedin, N. Lidström)
M. Streit (P. Della Rossa, M. Plüss) – 8:37	1–1
	1–2	13:49 – F. Modin (P. Forsberg, D. Alfredsson) (PP)
	1–3	22:17 – H. Zetterberg (T. Holmström, K. Jönsson)
	1–4	29:07 – M. Sundin (N. Lidström, D. Alfredsson) (PP)
	1–5	32:52 – M. Sundin (P. Forsberg, D. Tjärnqvist)
R. Lemm (I. Rüthemann) – 40:49	2–5
	2–6	48:36 − S. Påhlsson (D. Alfredsson, P. Axelsson)

8 min
Penalties
2 min
29
Shots
27

=== Women's tournament ===
Players

No.	Position	Name	Height	Weight	Birthdate	Birthplace	2005–06 Team
22	F	Silvia Bruggmann	168	54	02/20/78	Lütisburg	EV Zug
10	D	Nicole Bullo	160	54	05/18/87	Bellinzona	HC Lugano
21	F	Sandra Cattaneo	166	64	01/25/75	Zürich	EHC Illnau-Effretikon
4	F	Daniela Diaz – A	170	66	06/16/82	Baar	EV Zug
25	G	Patricia Elsmore-Sautter	166	67	02/28/79	Schaffhausen	Roseau / United States
11	D	Angela Frautschi	168	67	06/05/87	Interlaken	DHC Langenthal
15	D	Ramona Fuhrer – C	163	68	04/13/79	Aarberg Be	DHC Lyss
9	D	Ruth Künzle	166	65	03/29/72	Gaiserwald-Waldkirch	HC Lugano
20	F	Kathrin Lehmann – A	172	68	02/27/80	Zürich	Lady Kodiaks Kornwestheim
23	D	Monika Leuenberger	180	82	04/11/73	Zürich	EV Zug
75	F	Jeanette Marty	173	74	08/11/75	Zug	EV Zug
6	D	Julia Marty	170	72	04/16/88	Zürich	EV Zug
69	F	Stefanie Marty	167	70	04/16/88	Zürich	EV Zug
66	F	Christine Meier	169	66	05/24/86	Buelach	EHC Illnau-Effretikon
55	D	Prisca Mosimann	184	75	03/19/75	Langenthal	DHC Langenthal
24	F	Sandrine Ray	163	60	05/11/83	Orbe	HC Lugano
49	F	Rachel Rochat	180	68	09/10/72	Summit, New Jersey	Needham / USA
27	F	Laura Ruhnke	172	74	12/25/83	Biel	HC Lugano
41	G	Florence Schelling	174	73	03/09/89	Zürich	GCK Lions
17	F	Tina Schumacher	160	60	03/20/78	Biel	DHC Lyss

Round-robin

Pos	Team	Pld	W	D	L	GF	GA	GD	Pts	Qualification
1	United States	3	3	0	0	18	3	+15	6	Semifinals
2	Finland	3	2	0	1	10	7	+3	4	Semifinals
3	Germany	3	1	0	2	2	9	−7	2	5–8th place semifinals
4	Switzerland	3	0	0	3	1	12	−11	0	5–8th place semifinals

11 February 2006; 18:05	United States	6–0 (1–0, 1–0, 4–0)	Switzerland	Torino Esposizioni, Turin; Attendance: 2,900

Game reference

Chanda Gunn
Goalies
Patricia Elsmore-Sautter
Referee:
(Czech Republic) Kateřina Ivičičová
Linesmen:
(Russia) Marina Konstantinova
(Canada) Kim Robichaud

Ka. King (Potter) – 02:38	1–0
Dunn-Luoma (SH2) – 32:27	2–0
Wendell (Ruggiero, Potter) – 47:53	3–0
Darwitz (Parsons) – 50:33	4–0
Wendell (Potter) – 52:40	5–0
Potter (Ruggiero) (PP) – 58:50	6–0

18 min
Penalties
14 min
56
Shots
9

13 February 2006; 17:35	Finland	4–0 (1–0, 0–0, 3–0)	Switzerland	Palasport Olimpico, Turin; Attendance: 4,259

Game reference

Noora Räty
Goalies
Florence Schelling
Referee:
(Germany) Bianca Walter
Linesmen:
(Sweden) Annica Flödén
(Czech Republic) Jana Zítková

Tuominen (Pelttari) (PP) – 14:10	1–0
Rantamäki – 45:21	2–0
Saarinen (Hoikkala, Tallus) – 51:58	3–0
Pehkonen (Rantamaki) – 52:50	4–0

18 min
Penalties
20 min
41
Shots
18

14 February 2006; 18:05	Switzerland	1–2 (0–0, 1–2, 0–0)	Germany	Torino Esposizioni, Turin; Attendance: 2,000

Game reference

Patricia Elsmore-Sautter
Goalies
Jennifer Harß
Referee:
(United States) Danyel Howard
Linesmen:
(Russia) Marina Konstantinova
(Netherlands) Ilse Robben

	0–1	23:16 – M. Lanzl (Becker)
Schumacher (Ju. Marty) (PP) – 29:00	1–1
	1–2	29:36 – Oswald (M. Lanzl, Ritter) (PP)

41 min
Penalties
18 min
22
Shots
31

Medal round

Classification 5–8

17 February 2006; 13:05	Russia	6–2 (1–1, 4–1, 1–0)	Switzerland	Torino Esposizioni, Turin; Attendance: 2,800

Game reference

Irina Gashennikova
Goalies
Patricia Elsmore-Sautter
Florence Schelling
Referee:
(Czech Republic) Kateřina Ivičičová
Linesmen:
(France) Anne-Sophie Boniface
(Sweden) Annica Flödén

Trefilova – 02:03	1–0
	1–1	10:52 – Rochat
Burina (Mishina, Barykina) – 25:14	2–1
Mishina (Smolentseva) – 26:19	3–1
Mishina (Byalkovskaya) (PP) – 30:00	4–1
	4–2	31:55 – Lehmann (Cattaneo, Bullo)
Mishina (Smolentseva) – 39:18	5–2
Kapustina (Shchelchkova) (PP) – 52:17	6–2

16 min
Penalties
12 min
36
Shots
18

7th place game

20 February 2006; 13:05	Switzerland	11–0 (4–0, 6–0, 1–0)	Italy	Torino Esposizioni, Turin; Attendance: 2,500

Game reference

Florence Schelling
Goalies
Luana Frasnelli
Debora Montanari
Referee:
(Canada) Stephanie Normand
Linesmen:
(Russia) Marina Konstantinova
(Finland) Sanna Mattila

Diaz – 04:33	1–0
Diaz (Mosimann) (PP) – 09:54	2–0
Ju. Marty (Diaz) (PP) – 16:06	3–0
Lehmann (S. Marty) – 16:41	4–0
Ruhnke (Rochat) – 22:36	5–0
Ju. Marty (Ruhnke) – 26:51	6–0
Meier (Kunzle) – 31:09	7–0
Lehmann (Mosimann) – 32:48	8–0
Ruhnke (Rochat) – 33:16	9–0
S. Marty (Lehmann) – 35:37	10–0
S. Marty (Lehmann) – 56:08	11–0

20 min
Penalties
20 min
53
Shots
29

== Luge ==
Neither Swiss luger managed to challenge for the top positions.

Athlete	Event	Final					
Athlete	Event	Run 1	Run 2	Run 3	Run 4	Total	Rank
Stefan Höhener	Men's singles	52.459	51.989	52.124	52.212	3:28.784	15
Martina Kocher	Women's singles	47.548	47.410	47.276	47.357	3:09.591	9

== Nordic combined ==
No individual Swiss athlete finished in the top 20 in Nordic Combined, but the team put on a strong run in the last two legs of the cross-country portion to finish fourth, though they were more than a minute back of a medal spot.

Athlete	Event	Ski jumping		Cross-country		
Athlete	Event	Points	Rank	Deficit	Time	Rank
Ronny Heer	Sprint	105.6	22	1:20	19:37.7 +1:08.7	20
Ronny Heer	Individual Gundersen	213.5	26	3:16	43:27.0 +3:42.4	24
Andreas Hurschler	Sprint	98.1	33	1:50	19:41.6 +1:12.6	21
Andreas Hurschler	Individual Gundersen	193.5	39	4:36	43:21.9 +3:37.3	23
Seppi Hurschler	Sprint	105.3	24	1:22	19:51.4 +1:22.4	24
Seppi Hurschler	Individual Gundersen	211.0	30	3:26	43:18.4 +3:33.8	22
Ivan Rieder	Sprint	105.5	23	1:21	20:42.0 +2:13.0	36
Ivan Rieder	Individual Gundersen	230.0	14	2:10	43:58.6 +4:14.0	27
Ronny Heer; Andreas Hurschler; Ivan Rieder; Jan Schmid	Team	839.6	7	1:14	51:14.9 +1:22.3	4

Note: 'Deficit' refers to the amount of time behind the leader a competitor began the cross-country portion of the event. Italicized numbers show the final deficit from the winner's finishing time.

== Skeleton ==
Maya Pedersen-Bieri won gold at both the 2001 and 2005 World championships, and comfortably took the Olympic title, winning by more than a full second and being the only woman to complete a run in less than a minute. Her 59.64 second time in the first run was a new women's track record at Cesana Pariol. Gregor Stähli was fifth after the first run, bu when others ahead of him faltered, he put together a solid run to earn a bronze medal.

Athlete	Event	Final			
Athlete	Event	Run 1	Run 2	Total	Rank
Tanja Morel	Women's	1:00.85	1:01.65	2:02.50	7
Maya Pedersen-Bieri	Women's	59.64	1:00.19	1:59.83	Gold medal
Gregor Stähli	Men's	58.41	58.39	1:56.80	Bronze medal

== Ski jumping ==
Simon Ammann, a double gold medalist in Salt Lake, could not recapture that form in Turin, where his best finish was 15th in the large hill event. Andreas Küttel was pre-qualified in both events, but poor second jumps in both left him outside the medals.

Athlete	Event	Qualifying		First round		Final		
Athlete	Event	Points	Rank	Points	Rank	Points	Total	Rank
Simon Ammann	Normal hill	106.0	33 Q	107.0	38	did not advance		38
Simon Ammann	Large hill	111.7	4 Q	104.4	20 Q	113.6	218.0	15
Andreas Küttel	Normal hill	134.5	1 PQ	133.5	4 Q	129.0	262.5	5
Andreas Küttel	Large hill	132.6	4 PQ	120.0	6 Q	119.1	239.1	6
Guido Landert	Normal hill	116.0	19 Q	97.0	48	did not advance		48
Guido Landert	Large hill	74.4	34 Q	85.3	37	did not advance		37
Michael Möllinger	Normal hill	127.0	4 Q	126.5	12 Q	122.5	249.0	13
Michael Möllinger	Large hill	91.3	17 Q	104.9	19 Q	120.0	224.9	13
Simon Ammann; Andreas Küttel; Guido Landert; Michael Möllinger	Team	n/a		424.2	8 Q	462.7	886.9	7

Note: PQ indicates a skier was pre-qualified for the final, based on entry rankings.

== Snowboarding ==
The Swiss Olympic team won four medals in snowboarding, more than in any other sport. Three of these came in the parallel giant slalom, as the Swiss swept the golds in both the men's and women's events. Daniela Meuli was seeded 6th after the qualifying run, but overcame deficits twice to make the final, and then won after her German opponent fell. Philipp Schoch earned his second consecutive gold medal in the men's event, winning the final against his brother Simon. In the women's snowboard cross final, Tanja Frieden was the beneficiary of American Lindsey Jacobellis's fall on the final hill, sweeping past the American to claim the gold medal.

Halfpipe

Athlete	Event	Qualifying run 1		Qualifying run 2		Final		
Athlete	Event	Points	Rank	Points	Rank	Run 1	Run 2	Rank
Therry Brunner	Men's halfpipe	23.0	26	9.2	33	did not advance		39
Frederik Kalbermatten	Men's halfpipe	16.8	32	30.8	18	did not advance		24
Markus Keller	Men's halfpipe	33.7	12	38.3	5 Q	(29.3)	38.5	7
Manuela Pesko	Women's halfpipe	7.1	32	36.9	3 Q	35.9	(14.2)	7
Gian Simmen	Men's halfpipe	32.0	14	33.8	13	did not advance		19

Note: In the final, the single best score from two runs is used to determine the ranking. A bracketed score indicates a run that wasn't counted.

Parallel GS

Athlete	Event	Qualification		Round of 16	Quarterfinals	Semifinals	Finals	
Athlete	Event	Time	Rank	Opposition Time	Opposition Time	Opposition Time	Opposition Time	Rank
Ursula Bruhin	Women's parallel giant slalom	1:21.47	7 Q	Krings (AUT) (10); W -2.06 (-0.06 -2.00)	Fletcher (USA) (2); L +0.15 (+0.12 +0.03)	Classification 5–8; Pomagalski (FRA) (3); L +4.76 (-1.50 +6.26)	7th place final Boldikova (RUS) (4); W -1.74 (-0.71 -1.03)	7
Heinz Inniger	Men's parallel giant slalom	1:09.96	3 Q	Walder (AUT) (3); W -0.66 (-0.25 -0.41)	Grabner (AUT) (6); L +0.61 (+1.35 -0.74)	Classification 5–8; Flander (SLO) (10); W -0.14 (+0.18 -0.32)	5th place final Kosir (SLO) (8); W -0.42 (-0.94 +0.52)	5
Gilles Jaquet	Men's parallel giant slalom	1:10.47	5 Q	Fischnaller (ITA) (12); W -0.51 (0.00 -0.51)	Bozzetto (FRA) (13); L +1.54 (+0.86 +0.68)	Classification 5–8; Kosir (SLO) (8); L +4.55 (-0.85 +5.40)	7th place final Flander (SLO) (10); L +0.41 (+0.12 +0.29)	8
Daniela Meuli	Women's parallel giant slalom	1:21.36	6 Q	Krings (AUT) (11); W -1.00 (-0.24 -0.76)	Pomagalski (FRA) (3); W -1.43 (-1.50 +0.07)	Fletcher (USA) (2); W -3.70 (+0.24 -3.94)	Kober (GER) (5); W -15.97 (-0.21 -15.76)	Gold medal
Philipp Schoch	Men's parallel giant slalom	1:09.83	2 Q	Oppliger (AUS) (15); W -1.37 (-0.89 -0.48)	Flander (SLO) (10); W -1.07 (-1.35 +0.28)	Grabner (AUT) (6); W -0.34 (-0.42 +0.08)	Schoch (SUI) (1); W -0.73 (-0.88 +0.15)	Gold medal
Simon Schoch	Men's parallel giant slalom	1:09.38	1 Q	Biveson (SWE) (16); W -0.52 (-0.14 -0.38)	Kosir (SLO) (8); W -1.27 (-0.59 -0.68)	Bozzetto (FRA) (13); W -0.38 (+0.31 -0.69)	Schoch (SUI) (2); L +0.73 (+0.88 -0.15)	Silver medal

Key: '+ Time' represents a deficit; the brackets indicate the results of each run.

Snowboard cross

Athlete	Event	Qualifying		1/8 finals	Quarterfinals	Semifinals	Finals	
Athlete	Event	Time	Rank	Position	Position	Position	Position	Rank
Mellie Francon	Women's snowboard cross	1:32.30	14 Q	n/a	1 Q	3	Classification 5–8; 1	5
Tanja Frieden	Women's snowboard cross	1:29.77	4 Q	n/a	1 Q	2 Q	1 Q	Gold medal
Marco Huser	Men's snowboard cross	1:20.26	2 Q	2 Q	3	did not advance	Classification 9–12; 1	9
Ueli Kestenholz	Men's snowboard cross	1:22.32	21 Q	4	did not advance			25
Olivia Nobs	Women's snowboard cross	1:30.44	7 Q	n/a	3	did not advance	Classification 9–12; 3	11
