= Germany at the 2006 Winter Olympics =

- IOC code: GER
- NOC: German Olympic Sports Confederation
- Website: www.dosb.de (in German, English, and French)

in Turin
- Competitors: 162 in 15 sports
- Flag bearers: Kati Wilhelm (opening); Claudia Pechstein (closing)
- Medals Ranked 1st: Gold 11 Silver 12 Bronze 6 Total 29

Winter Olympics appearances (overview)
- 1928; 1932; 1936; 1948; 1952; 1956–1988; 1992; 1994; 1998; 2002; 2006; 2010; 2014; 2018; 2022; 2026

Other related appearances
- United Team of Germany (1956–1964); East Germany (1968–1988); West Germany (1968–1988)

Germany competed at the 2006 Winter Olympics in Turin, Italy, winning once again the most total medals of any nation. The National Olympic Committee of Germany (German: Nationales Olympisches Komitee für Deutschland, reorganized to German Olympic Sports Confederation (German: Deutscher Olympischer Sportbund, DOSB) in May 2006) nominated a total of 162 (164) athletes to compete, as the 5th largest team, in all 15 of the Winter Olympic sports.

== Medalists ==
| Medal | Name | Sport | Event | Date |
|---|---|---|---|---|
| Gold | Kati Wilhelm | Biathlon | Women's pursuit | 18 Feb |
| Gold | Sven Fischer | Biathlon | Men's sprint | 14 Feb |
| Gold | Michael Greis | Biathlon | Men's individual | 11 Feb |
| Gold | Ricco Groß; Michael Rösch; Sven Fischer; Michael Greis | Biathlon | Men's relay | 21 Feb |
| Gold | Michael Greis | Biathlon | Men's mass start | 25 Feb |
| Gold | André Lange; Kevin Kuske | Bobsleigh | Two-man | 19 Feb |
| Gold | Sandra Kiriasis; Anja Schneiderheinze | Bobsleigh | Two-woman | 21 Feb |
| Gold | André Lange; René Hoppe; Kevin Kuske; Martin Putze | Bobsleigh | Four-man | 25 Feb |
| Gold | Sylke Otto | Luge | Women's singles | 14 Feb |
| Gold | Georg Hettich | Nordic combined | Men's individual | 11 Feb |
| Gold | Daniela Anschütz-Thoms; Lucille Opitz; Claudia Pechstein; Sabine Völker; Anni Friesinger | Speed skating | Women's team pursuit | 16 Feb |
| Silver | Martina Glagow | Biathlon | Women's pursuit | 18 Feb |
| Silver | Martina Glagow | Biathlon | Women's individual | 13 Feb |
| Silver | Kati Wilhelm | Biathlon | Women's mass start | 25 Feb |
| Silver | Martina Glagow; Andrea Henkel; Katrin Apel; Kati Wilhelm | Biathlon | Women's relay | 23 Feb |
| Silver | Stefanie Böhler; Viola Bauer; Evi Sachenbacher-Stehle; Claudia Künzel | Cross-country skiing | Women's 4 x 5 km relay | 18 Feb |
| Silver | Andreas Schlütter; Jens Filbrich; René Sommerfeldt; Tobias Angerer | Cross-country skiing | Men's 4 x 10 km relay | 19 Feb |
| Silver | Claudia Künzel | Cross-country skiing | Women's sprint | 22 Feb |
| Silver | Silke Kraushaar | Luge | Women's singles | 14 Feb |
| Silver | Andre Florschütz; Torsten Wustlich | Luge | Doubles | 15 Feb |
| Silver | Björn Kircheisen; Georg Hettich; Ronny Ackermann; Jens Gaiser | Nordic combined | Men's team | 16 Feb |
| Silver | Amelie Kober | Snowboarding | Women's parallel giant slalom | 23 Feb |
| Silver | Claudia Pechstein | Speed skating | Women's 5000 m | 25 Feb |
| Bronze | Sven Fischer | Biathlon | Men's pursuit | 18 Feb |
| Bronze | Uschi Disl | Biathlon | Women's mass start | 25 Feb |
| Bronze | Tobias Angerer | Cross-country skiing | Men's 15 km classical | 17 Feb |
| Bronze | Tatjana Hüfner | Luge | Women's singles | 14 Feb |
| Bronze | Georg Hettich | Nordic combined | Men's sprint | 21 Feb |
| Bronze | Anni Friesinger | Speed skating | Women's 1000 m | 19 Feb |

Medals by sport
| Sport | gold | silver | bronze | Total |
| Biathlon | 5 | 4 | 2 | 11 |
| Bobsleigh | 3 | 0 | 0 | 3 |
| Cross-country skiing | 0 | 3 | 1 | 4 |
| Luge | 1 | 2 | 1 | 4 |
| Nordic combined | 1 | 1 | 1 | 3 |
| Snowboarding | 0 | 1 | 0 | 1 |
| Speed skating | 1 | 1 | 1 | 3 |
| Total | 11 | 12 | 6 | 29 |

== Alpine skiing ==
| Athlete | Event | Final | | | | |
| Athlete | Event | Run 1 | Run 2 | Run 3 | Total | Rank |
|---|---|---|---|---|---|---|
| Monika Bergmann-Schmuderer | Women's slalom | 43.48 | 48.36 | n/a | 1:31.84 | 16 |
| Monika Bergmann-Schmuderer | Women's combined | 40.37 | 43.89 | 1:32.54 | 2:56.80 | 16 |
| Martina Ertl-Renz | Women's super-G | n/a | | | 1:34.03 | 16 |
| Martina Ertl-Renz | Women's giant slalom | 1:01.44 | 1:11.10 | n/a | 2:12.54 | 15 |
| Martina Ertl-Renz | Women's slalom | did not finish | | | | |
| Martina Ertl-Renz | Women's combined | 39.28 | 43.92 | 1:31.08 | 2:54.28 | 7 |
| Annemarie Gerg | Women's giant slalom | 1:03.04 | did not finish | | | |
| Annemarie Gerg | Women's slalom | 43.37 | 47.52 | n/a | 1:30.89 | 7 |
| Petra Haltmayr | Women's downhill | n/a | | | 1:57.69 | 6 |
| Petra Haltmayr | Women's super-G | n/a | | | 1:33.50 | 9 |
| Felix Neureuther | Men's giant slalom | did not finish | | | | |
| Felix Neureuther | Men's slalom | 55.16 | did not finish | | | |
| Alois Vogl | Men's slalom | did not finish | | | | |

Note: In the men's combined, run 1 is the downhill, and runs 2 and 3 are the slalom. In the women's combined, run 1 and 2 are the slalom, and run 3 the downhill.

== Biathlon ==
Men

| Athlete | Event | Final | | |
| Athlete | Event | Time | Misses | Rank |
|---|---|---|---|---|
| Sven Fischer | Sprint | 26:11.6 | 0 | Gold medal |
| Sven Fischer | Pursuit | 35:35.80 | 4 | Bronze medal |
| Sven Fischer | Mass start | 48:53.7 | 2 | 17 |
| Sven Fischer | Individual | 57:14.3 | 3 | 17 |
| Michael Greis | Sprint | 28:22.9 | 3 | 34 |
| Michael Greis | Pursuit | 36:39.98 | 4 | 8 |
| Michael Greis | Mass start | 47:20.0 | 1 | Gold medal |
| Michael Greis | Individual | 54:23.0 | 1 | Gold medal |
| Ricco Groß | Sprint | 27:15.1 | 0 | 6 |
| Ricco Groß | Pursuit | 37:23.51 | 2 | 12 |
| Ricco Groß | Individual | 56"14.3 | 1 | 11 |
| Michael Rösch | Mass start | 48:19.9 | 3 | 10 |
| Michael Rösch | Individual | 59:56.6 | 6 | 42 |
| Alexander Wolf | Sprint | 27:34.5 | 2 | 14 |
| Alexander Wolf | Pursuit | 37:35.40 | 6 | 19 |
| Alexander Wolf | Mass start | 48:15.3 | 2 | 8 |
| Ricco Groß; Michael Rösch; Sven Fischer; Michael Greis | Relay | 1:21:51.5 | 9 | Gold medal |

Women

| Athlete | Event | Final | | |
| Athlete | Event | Time | Misses | Rank |
|---|---|---|---|---|
| Katrin Apel | Sprint | 24:04.9 | 2 | 22 |
| Katrin Apel | Pursuit | 39:38.95 | 3 | 11 |
| Uschi Disl | Sprint | 24:29.1 | 3 | 34 |
| Uschi Disl | Pursuit | 39:30.83 | 7 | 10 |
| Uschi Disl | Mass start | 41:18.4 | 3 | Bronze medal |
| Uschi Disl | Individual | 52:49.7 | 5 | 12 |
| Martina Glagow | Sprint | 23:35.9 | 1 | 17 |
| Martina Glagow | Pursuit | 37:57.29 | 3 | Silver medal |
| Martina Glagow | Mass start | 41:33.6 | 2 | 4 |
| Martina Glagow | Individual | 50:34.9 | 2 | Silver medal |
| Andrea Henkel | Mass start | 42:41.5 | 3 | 13 |
| Andrea Henkel | Individual | 51:46.3 | 2 | 4 |
| Kati Wilhelm | Sprint | 22:49.8 | 1 | 7 |
| Kati Wilhelm | Pursuit | 36:43.6 | 2 | Gold medal |
| Kati Wilhelm | Mass start | 40:55.3 | 1 | Silver medal |
| Kati Wilhelm | Individual | 52:59.0 | 5 | 16 |
| Martina Glagow; Andrea Henkel; Katrin Apel; Kati Wilhelm | Relay | 1:17:03.2 | 9 | Silver medal |

== Bobsleigh ==
| Athlete | Event | Final | | | | | |
| Athlete | Event | Run 1 | Run 2 | Run 3 | Run 4 | Total | Rank |
|---|---|---|---|---|---|---|---|
| André Lange; Kevin Kuske | Two-man | 55.28 | 55.73 | 56.01 | 56.36 | 3:43.38 | Gold medal |
| Matthias Höpfner; Marc Kühne | Two-man | 55.56 | 55.82 | 56.24 | 56.63 | 3:44.25 | 5 |
| Sandra Kiriasis; Anja Schneiderheinze | Two-woman | 57.16 | 57.77 | 57.34 | 57.71 | 3:49.98 | Gold medal |
| Susi Erdmann; Nicole Herschmann | Two-woman | 57.26 | 57.75 | 58.04 | 58.27 | 3:51.32 | 5 |
| André Lange; René Hoppe; Kevin Kuske; Martin Putze | Four-man | 55.20 | 55.30 | 54.80 | 55.12 | 3:40.42 | Gold medal |
| René Spies; Christoph Heyder; Enrico Kühn; Alexander Metzger | Four-man | 55.47 | 55.48 | 54.91 | 55.18 | 3:41.04 | 5 |

== Cross-country skiing ==
Sachenbacher-Stehle was suspended for health reasons for the first five days of competition after recording too high values of haemoglobin in her blood.

Distance

Men

| Athlete | Event | Final | |
| Athlete | Event | Total | Rank |
|---|---|---|---|
| Tobias Angerer | 15 km classical | 38:20.5 | Bronze medal |
| Tobias Angerer | 30 km pursuit | 1:17:12.5 | 12 |
| Tobias Angerer | 50 km freestyle | 2:07:00.3 | 24 |
| Jens Filbrich | 30 km pursuit | 1:18:38.2 | 23 |
| Jens Filbrich | 50 km freestyle | 2:06:31.1 | 17 |
| Franz Göring | 15 km classical | 41:29.9 | 43 |
| Andreas Schlütter | 15 km classical | 38:44.7 | 7 |
| René Sommerfeldt | Men's 15 km classical | 39:17.2 | 11 |
| René Sommerfeldt | 30 km pursuit | Did not finish | |
| René Sommerfeldt | 50 km freestyle | 2:08:03.0 | 36 |
| Andreas Schlütter; Jens Filbrich; René Sommerfeldt; Tobias Angerer | 4 x 10 km relay | 1:44:01.4 | Silver medal |

Women

| Athlete | Event | Final | |
| Athlete | Event | Total | Rank |
|---|---|---|---|
| Viola Bauer | 10 km classical | 29:03.6 | 10 |
| Stefanie Böhler | 10 km classical | 30:43.2 | 38 |
| Stefanie Böhler | 15 km pursuit | 45:56.9 | 28 |
| Stefanie Böhler | 30 km freestyle | 1:26:19.2 | 20 |
| Nicole Fessel | 30 km freestyle | 1:34:06.2 | 48 |
| Manuela Henkel | 15 km pursuit | 48:21.8 | 52 |
| Claudia Künzel | 10 km classical | 29:31.6 | 17 |
| Claudia Künzel | 15 km pursuit | 44:48.1 | 18 |
| Claudia Künzel | 30 km freestyle | 1:23:02.1 | 6 |
| Evi Sachenbacher-Stehle | 10 km classical | 29:38.4 | 20 |
| Evi Sachenbacher-Stehle | 30 km freestyle | 1:25:15.8 | 13 |
| Stefanie Böhler; Viola Bauer; Evi Sachenbacher-Stehle; Claudia Künzel | 4 x 5 km relay | 54:57.7 | Silver medal |

Sprint

| Athlete | Event | Qualifying | | Quarterfinal | | Semifinal | | Final | |
| Athlete | Event | Total | Rank | Total | Rank | Total | Rank | Total | Rank |
|---|---|---|---|---|---|---|---|---|---|
| Stefanie Böhler | Women's sprint | 2:18.14 | 30 Q | 2:18.5 | 4 | Did not advance | | | 20 |
| Nicole Fessel | Women's sprint | 2:18.35 | 31 | Did not advance | | | | | 20 |
| Manuela Henkel | Women's sprint | 2:16.04 | 14 Q | 2:16.4 | 3 | Did not advance | | | 12 |
| Claudia Künzel | Women's sprint | 2:13.64 | 4 Q | 2:15.5 | 1 Q | 2:15.5 | 1 Q | 2:13.0 | Silver medal |
| Jens Filbrich; Andreas Schlütter | Men's team sprint | n/a | | | | 17:22.6 | 3 Q | 17:14.0 | 4 |
| Evi Sachenbacher-Stehle; Viola Bauer | Women's team sprint | n/a | | | | 17:34.7 | 4 Q | 17:03.5 | 5 |

== Curling ==
=== Men's tournament ===
Team: Andy Kapp (skip), Uli Kapp, Oliver Axnick, Holger Höhne, Andreas Kempf (alternate)

Round Robin

Draw 2

| Team | 1 | 2 | 3 | 4 | 5 | 6 | 7 | 8 | 9 | 10 | Final |
|---|---|---|---|---|---|---|---|---|---|---|---|
| Germany (Kapp) | 2 | 0 | 2 | 0 | 0 | 0 | 0 | 1 | 0 | X | 5 |
| Canada (Gushue) 🔨 | 0 | 2 | 0 | 3 | 1 | 1 | 1 | 0 | 2 | X | 10 |

;Draw 3

| Team | 1 | 2 | 3 | 4 | 5 | 6 | 7 | 8 | 9 | 10 | 11 | Final |
|---|---|---|---|---|---|---|---|---|---|---|---|---|
| Germany (Kapp) | 0 | 1 | 2 | 0 | 1 | 0 | 0 | 4 | 0 | 0 | 0 | 8 |
| Italy (Retornaz) 🔨 | 1 | 0 | 0 | 2 | 0 | 2 | 0 | 0 | 2 | 1 | 1 | 9 |

;Draw 5

| Team | 1 | 2 | 3 | 4 | 5 | 6 | 7 | 8 | 9 | 10 | Final |
|---|---|---|---|---|---|---|---|---|---|---|---|
| Germany (Kapp) 🔨 | 0 | 0 | 1 | 0 | 0 | 2 | 0 | 1 | 1 | 0 | 5 |
| Finland (Uusipaavalniemi) | 0 | 0 | 0 | 0 | 1 | 0 | 0 | 0 | 0 | 1 | 2 |

;Draw 6

| Team | 1 | 2 | 3 | 4 | 5 | 6 | 7 | 8 | 9 | 10 | Final |
|---|---|---|---|---|---|---|---|---|---|---|---|
| Great Britain (Murdoch) | 0 | 0 | 0 | 2 | 0 | 2 | 1 | 0 | 2 | 0 | 7 |
| Germany (Kapp) 🔨 | 0 | 0 | 2 | 0 | 0 | 0 | 0 | 2 | 0 | 2 | 6 |

;Draw 7

| Team | 1 | 2 | 3 | 4 | 5 | 6 | 7 | 8 | 9 | 10 | Final |
|---|---|---|---|---|---|---|---|---|---|---|---|
| Switzerland (Stöckli) | 2 | 0 | 0 | 0 | 0 | 2 | 0 | 0 | 4 | 0 | 8 |
| Germany (Kapp) 🔨 | 0 | 0 | 0 | 1 | 1 | 0 | 1 | 0 | 0 | 1 | 5 |

;Draw 9

| Team | 1 | 2 | 3 | 4 | 5 | 6 | 7 | 8 | 9 | 10 | Final |
|---|---|---|---|---|---|---|---|---|---|---|---|
| Germany (Kapp) | 0 | 0 | 1 | 0 | 1 | 0 | 2 | 0 | 1 | X | 5 |
| United States (Fenson) 🔨 | 2 | 1 | 0 | 0 | 0 | 2 | 0 | 3 | 0 | 0 | 8 |

;Draw 10

| Team | 1 | 2 | 3 | 4 | 5 | 6 | 7 | 8 | 9 | 10 | Final |
|---|---|---|---|---|---|---|---|---|---|---|---|
| Germany (Kapp) | 0 | 0 | 0 | 1 | 0 | 4 | 1 | 0 | 0 | 1 | 7 |
| Sweden (Lindholm) 🔨 | 0 | 1 | 0 | 0 | 2 | 0 | 0 | 1 | 1 | 0 | 5 |

;Draw 11

| Team | 1 | 2 | 3 | 4 | 5 | 6 | 7 | 8 | 9 | 10 | Final |
|---|---|---|---|---|---|---|---|---|---|---|---|
| Norway (Trulsen) 🔨 | 0 | 0 | 1 | 0 | 0 | 2 | 0 | 1 | 0 | 1 | 5 |
| Germany (Kapp) | 0 | 1 | 0 | 0 | 1 | 0 | 0 | 0 | 0 | 0 | 2 |

;Draw 12

| Team | 1 | 2 | 3 | 4 | 5 | 6 | 7 | 8 | 9 | 10 | Final |
|---|---|---|---|---|---|---|---|---|---|---|---|
| New Zealand (Becker) | 0 | 1 | 0 | 0 | 0 | 0 | X | X | X | X | 1 |
| Germany (Kapp) 🔨 | 2 | 0 | 3 | 2 | 2 | 1 | X | X | X | X | 10 |

Standings

| Rank | Team | Skip | Won | Lost |
|---|---|---|---|---|
| 1 | Finland | Markku Uusipaavalniemi | 7 | 2 |
| 2 | Canada | Brad Gushue | 6 | 3 |
| 3 | United States | Pete Fenson | 6 | 3 |
| 4 | Great Britain | David Murdoch | 6 | 3 |
| 5 | Norway | Pål Trulsen | 5 | 4 |
| 6 | Switzerland | Ralph Stöckli | 5 | 4 |
| 7 | Italy | Joel Retornaz | 4 | 5 |
| 8 | Sweden | Peter Lindholm | 3 | 6 |
| 9 | Germany | Andy Kapp | 3 | 6 |
| 10 | New Zealand | Sean Becker | 0 | 9 |

== Figure skating ==
| Athlete | Event | CD | | SP/OD | | FS/FD | | Total | |
| Athlete | Event | Points | Rank | Points | Rank | Points | Rank | Points | Rank |
|---|---|---|---|---|---|---|---|---|---|
| Stefan Lindemann | Men's | n/a | | 60.52 | 20 Q | 112.05 | 20 | 172.57 | 21 |
| Rico Rex; Eva-Maria Fitze | Pairs | n/a | | 43.86 | 16 | 76.37 | 16 | 120.23 | 15 |
| Robin Szolkowy; Aljona Savchenko | Pairs | n/a | | 60.96 | 7 | 119.19 | 5 | 180.15 | 6 |

Key: CD = Compulsory Dance, FD = Free Dance, FS = Free Skate, OD = Original Dance, SP = Short Program

== Freestyle skiing ==
| Athlete | Event | Qualifying | | Final | |
| Athlete | Event | Points | Rank | Points | Rank |
|---|---|---|---|---|---|
| Gerhard Blöchl | Men's moguls | 21.16 | 28 | did not advance | 28 |
| Christoph Stark | Men's moguls | 23.65 | 12 Q | 22.84 | 15 |

== Ice hockey ==
Germany's ice hockey contingent was the nation's largest at the Olympics, with 20 women and 23 men.

=== Men's tournament ===
Players

The following is the German roster for the men's ice hockey tournament at the 2006 Winter Olympics.

Head coach: Uwe Krupp

Assistant coach: Ernst Höfner

| No. | Pos. | Name | Height | Weight | Birthdate | Team |
|---|---|---|---|---|---|---|
| 5 | D | Robert Leask | 6 ft 2 in (188 cm) | 205 lb (93 kg) | June 9, 1971 (aged 34) | (Germany) Eisbären Berlin |
| 7 | D | Sashca Goc | 6 ft 2 in (188 cm) | 227 lb (103 kg) | April 14, 1979 (aged 26) | (Germany) Hannover Scorpions |
| 10 | D | Christian Ehrhoff | 6 ft 2 in (188 cm) | 201 lb (91 kg) | July 6, 1982 (aged 23) | (United States) San Jose Sharks |
| 11 | F | Sven Felski | 5 ft 11 in (180 cm) | 168 lb (76 kg) | November 18, 1974 (aged 31) | (Germany) Eisbären Berlin |
| 13 | D | Christoph Schubert | 6 ft 3 in (191 cm) | 236 lb (107 kg) | February 5, 1982 (aged 24) | (Canada) Ottawa Senators |
| 15 | D | Stefan Schauer | 6 ft 1 in (185 cm) | 187 lb (85 kg) | January 12, 1983 (aged 23) | (Germany) Nürnberg Ice Tigers |
| 16 | F | Stefan Ustorf (C) | 5 ft 11 in (180 cm) | 194 lb (88 kg) | January 3, 1974 (aged 32) | (Germany) Eisbären Berlin |
| 26 | F | Daniel Kreutzer | 5 ft 9 in (175 cm) | 192 lb (87 kg) | October 23, 1979 (aged 26) | (Germany) DEG Metro Stars |
| 29 | F | Alexander Barta | 5 ft 10 in (178 cm) | 183 lb (83 kg) | February 2, 1983 (aged 23) | (Germany) Hamburg Freezers |
| 31 | D | Andreas Renz | 6 ft 0 in (183 cm) | 207 lb (94 kg) | June 12, 1977 (aged 28) | (Germany) Kölner Haie |
| 32 | F | Tomas Martinec | 6 ft 0 in (183 cm) | 190 lb (86 kg) | March 5, 1976 (aged 29) | (Germany) Nürnberg Ice Tigers |
| 34 | F | Eduard Lewandowski | 6 ft 2 in (188 cm) | 203 lb (92 kg) | September 7, 1980 (aged 25) | (Germany) Kölner Haie |
| 37 | G | Olaf Kölzig | 6 ft 3 in (191 cm) | 225 lb (102 kg) | April 6, 1970 (aged 35) | (United States) Washington Capitals |
| 40 | G | Thomas Greiss | 6 ft 2 in (188 cm) | 218 lb (99 kg) | January 29, 1986 (aged 20) | (Germany) Kölner Haie |
| 46 | F | Florian Busch | 6 ft 2 in (188 cm) | 196 lb (89 kg) | January 2, 1985 (aged 21) | (Germany) Eisbären Berlin |
| 49 | F | Klaus Kathan | 6 ft 0 in (183 cm) | 187 lb (85 kg) | January 7, 1977 (aged 29) | (Germany) DEG Metro Stars |
| 52 | D | Alexander Sulzer | 6 ft 2 in (188 cm) | 207 lb (94 kg) | May 30, 1984 (aged 21) | (Germany) DEG Metro Stars |
| 54 | F | Sebastian Furchner | 5 ft 9 in (175 cm) | 185 lb (84 kg) | May 3, 1982 (aged 23) | (Germany) Kölner Haie |
| 57 | F | Marcel Goc | 6 ft 0 in (183 cm) | 203 lb (92 kg) | August 24, 1983 (aged 22) | (United States) San Jose Sharks |
| 58 | D | Lasse Kopitz | 6 ft 3 in (191 cm) | 198 lb (90 kg) | May 29, 1980 (aged 25) | (Germany) Kölner Haie |
| 72 | F | Petr Fical (A) | 5 ft 10 in (178 cm) | 181 lb (82 kg) | September 23, 1977 (aged 28) | (Germany) Nürnberg Ice Tigers |
| 73 | F | Tino Boos | 6 ft 0 in (183 cm) | 187 lb (85 kg) | April 10, 1975 (aged 30) | (Germany) Kölner Haie |
| 80 | G | Robert Müller | 5 ft 8 in (173 cm) | 187 lb (85 kg) | June 25, 1980 (aged 25) | (Germany) Krefeld Pinguine |
| 84 | D | Dennis Seidenberg | 6 ft 0 in (183 cm) | 198 lb (90 kg) | June 18, 1981 (aged 24) | (United States) Phoenix Coyotes |

Round-robin

| Pos | Team | Pld | W | D | L | GF | GA | GD | Pts | Qualification |
|---|---|---|---|---|---|---|---|---|---|---|
| 1 | Finland | 5 | 5 | 0 | 0 | 19 | 2 | +17 | 10 | Quarterfinals |
| 2 | Switzerland | 5 | 2 | 2 | 1 | 10 | 12 | −2 | 6 | Quarterfinals |
| 3 | Canada | 5 | 3 | 0 | 2 | 15 | 9 | +6 | 6 | Quarterfinals |
| 4 | Czech Republic | 5 | 2 | 0 | 3 | 14 | 12 | +2 | 4 | Quarterfinals |
| 5 | Germany | 5 | 0 | 2 | 3 | 7 | 16 | −9 | 2 | |
| 6 | Italy (H) | 5 | 0 | 2 | 3 | 9 | 23 | −14 | 2 | |

Source: IIHF
(H) Hosts

| 15 February 2006; 17:05 | Germany | 1–4 (1–0, 0–2, 0–2) | Czech Republic | Palasport Olimpico, Turin; Attendance: 6,463 |

Game reference

Olaf Kölzig
Goalies
Dominik Hašek (out 9:25)
Tomáš Vokoun (in 9:25)
Referee:
(Canada) Dan Marouelli
Linesmen:
(United States) Kevin Redding
(United States) Tony Sericolo

| T. Boos (A. Sulzer) (PP) – 19:10 | 1–0 |
| | 1–1 | 21:02 – T. Kaberle (P. Kubina, T. Vokoun) (PP) |
| | 1–2 | 23:38 – T. Kaberle (M. Straka, J. Jágr) (PP) |
| | 1–3 | 57:47 – J. Jágr |
| | 1–4 | 59:32 – D. Výborný (EN) |

10 min
Penalties
12 min
25
Shots
34

| 16 February 2006; 20:05 | Canada | 5–1 (3–0, 1–1, 1–0) | Germany | Palasport Olimpico, Turin; Attendance: 8,554 |

Game reference

Roberto Luongo
Goalies
Thomas Greiss
Referee:
(Sweden) Christer Lärking
Linesmen:
(Slovakia) Miroslav Halecký
(United States) Thor Nelson

| W. Redden (S. Gagné, J. Thornton) – 4:52 | 1–0 |
| J. Sakic (T. Bertuzzi, R. Nash) (PP) – 7:29 | 2–0 |
| S. Gagné (R. Regehr, B. Richards) – 10:49 | 3–0 |
| | 3–1 | 29:13 – C. Ehrhoff (C. Schubert, S. Ustorf) |
| D. Heatley (A. Foote) – 35:37 | 4–1 |
| S. Doan (R. Smyth) – 59:26 | 5–1 |

24 min
Penalties
18 min
40
Shots
12

| 18 February 2006; 13:05 | Italy | 3–3 (1–0, 0–1, 2–2) | Germany | Palasport Olimpico, Turin; Attendance: 8,908 |

Game reference

Jason Muzzatti
Goalies
Olaf Kölzig
Referee:
(Finland) Timo Favorin
Linesmen:
(Sweden) Joacim Karlsson
(Slovakia) Milan Mášik

| J. Parco (T. Iob) – 2:03 | 1–0 |
| | 1–1 | 26:21 – T. Martinec (T. Boos) |
| T. Iob (J. Parco, G. de Bettin) – 44:27 | 2–1 |
| | 2–2 | 47:16 – S. Felski (D. Kreutzer) |
| C. Borgatello (G. de Bettin, M. Chitaroni) (SH) – 58:28 | 3–2 |
| | 3–3 | 58:43 – M. Goc (D. Kreutzer, E. Lewandowski) (PP) |

18 min
Penalties
16 min
21
Shots
34

| 19 February 2006; 12:05 | Germany | 2–2 (0–0, 1–2, 1–0) | Switzerland | Palasport Olimpico, Turin; Attendance: 8,756 |

Game reference

Olaf Kölzig
Goalies
David Aebischer
Referee:
(Canada) Don Van Massenhoven
Linesmen:
(United States) Kevin Redding
(Russia) Sergei Shelyanin

| S. Felski (C. Ehrhoff) – 22:20 | 1–0 |
| | 1–1 | 28:17 – F. Conne (P. Fischer) |
| | 1–2 | 38:05 – P. DiPietro (P. Della Rossa) |
| T. Boos (E. Lewandowski) – 52:09 | 2–2 |

8 min
Penalties
8 min
28
Shots
25

| 21 February 2006; 15:35 | Finland | 2–0 (1–0, 1–0, 0–0) | Germany | Torino Esposizioni, Turin; Attendance: 2,430 |

Game reference
| Fredrik Norrena | Goalies | Robert Müller | Referee: (Switzerland) Danny Kurmann; Linesmen: (Slovakia) Miroslav Halecký (United States) Kevin Redding |
| N. Kapanen (N. Hagman, S. Koivu) (PP) – 2:35 / 1–0; S. Koivu (J. Lehtinen, T. Selänne) – 39:39 / 2–0 | | | Referee: (Switzerland) Danny Kurmann; Linesmen: (Slovakia) Miroslav Halecký (United States) Kevin Redding |
| 6 min | Penalties | 18 min | Referee: (Switzerland) Danny Kurmann; Linesmen: (Slovakia) Miroslav Halecký (United States) Kevin Redding |
| 25 | Shots | 18 | Referee: (Switzerland) Danny Kurmann; Linesmen: (Slovakia) Miroslav Halecký (United States) Kevin Redding |

=== Women's tournament ===
Players

| No. | Position | Name | Height | Weight | Birthdate | Birthplace | 2004–05 team |
|---|---|---|---|---|---|---|---|
| 81 | F | Maritta Becker – A | 168 | 61 | 03/11/81 | Heilbronn | DSC Oberthurgau |
| 25 | F | Franziska Busch | 163 | 59 | 10/20/85 | Seesen | WSV Braunlage |
| 66 | F | Bettina Evers | 168 | 66 | 08/17/81 | Hanover | Grefrather EC |
| 18 | D | Susanne Fellner | 160 | 57 | 02/26/85 | Ravensburg | DSC Oberthurgau |
| 24 | F | Stephanie Frühwirt | 166 | 64 | 07/22/80 | Wolfratshausen | TV Kornwestheim |
| 12 | F | Susann Götz | 164 | 62 | 12/14/82 | Bad Muskau | OSC Berlin |
| 29 | F | Claudia Grundmann – A | 177 | 69 | 04/22/76 | Berlin | OSC Berlin |
| 30 | G | Jennifer Harss | 173 | 65 | 07/14/87 | Füssen | ECDC Memmingen |
| 10 | F | Nikola Holmes | 177 | 72 | 02/18/81 | Bellflower, California | OSC Berlin |
| 23 | D | Sabrina Kruck | 167 | 61 | 11/03/81 | Starnberg | SC Riessersee |
| 28 | F | Andrea Lanzl | 161 | 60 | 10/08/87 | Starnberg | EC Bergkamen, Bergkamen |
| 21 | F | Michaela Lanzl | 161 | 55 | 02/21/83 | Starnberg | University of Minnesota Duluth |
| 19 | D | Christina Oswald – C | 172 | 75 | 07/26/73 | Garmisch-Partenkirchen | SC Riessersee |
| 15 | D | Nina Ritter | 168 | 60 | 01/26/81 | Hamburg | Hamburger SV |
| 14 | F | Anja Scheytt | 174 | 69 | 12/05/80 | Mannheim | OSC Berlin |
| 17 | F | Sara Seiler | 169 | 61 | 01/25/83 | Hausham | DSC Oberthurgau |
| 16 | F | Denise Soesilo | 168 | 50 | 05/10/87 | Hamburg | Hamburger SV |
| 2 | D | Jenny Tamas | 172 | 63 | 01/18/90 | Herford | ERV Schweinfurt |
| 13 | G | Stephanie Wartosch-Kürten | 172 | 68 | 11/12/78 | Düsseldorf | OSC Berlin |
| 9 | F | Raffaela Wolf | 168 | 52 | 06/20/78 | Dinslaken | ESC Planegg-Würmtal |

Round-robin

| Pos | Team | Pld | W | D | L | GF | GA | GD | Pts | Qualification |
|---|---|---|---|---|---|---|---|---|---|---|
| 1 | United States | 3 | 3 | 0 | 0 | 18 | 3 | +15 | 6 | Semifinals |
| 2 | Finland | 3 | 2 | 0 | 1 | 10 | 7 | +3 | 4 | Semifinals |
| 3 | Germany | 3 | 1 | 0 | 2 | 2 | 9 | −7 | 2 | 5–8th place semifinals |
| 4 | Switzerland | 3 | 0 | 0 | 3 | 1 | 12 | −11 | 0 | 5–8th place semifinals |

| 11 February 2006; 13:05 | Finland | 3–0 (2–0, 0–0, 1–0) | Germany | Torino Esposizioni, Turin; Attendance: 3,200 |

Game reference

Maija Hassinen
Goalies
Stephanie Wartosch-Kürten
Referee:
(Russia) Arina Ustinova
Linesmen:
(France) Anne-Sophie Boniface
(Czech Republic) Klára Quagliato

| Pehkonen (Pelttari, Tuominen) – 08:15 | 1–0 |
| Pelttari (PP2) – 17:02 | 2–0 |
| Pälvilä (SH) – 43:13 | 3–0 |

4 min
Penalties
6 min
27
Shots
24

| 12 February 2006; 19:05 | Germany | 0–5 (0–2, 0–2, 0–1) | United States | Palasport Olimpico, Turin; Attendance: 7,794 |

Game reference

Jennifer Harß
Goalies
Pam Dreyer
Referee:
(Finland) Anu Hirvonen
Linesmen:
(Sweden) Annica Flödén
(Norway) Marte Hove

| 0–1 | 04:33 – Potter (Ka. King) (PP) |
| 0–2 | 17:13 – Ka. King (Chu, Potter) (PP) |
| 0–3 | 21:11 – Parsons (Resor, Stephens) |
| 0–4 | 29:57 – Darwitz (Parsons, Ka. King) |
| 0–5 | 50:54 – Parsons (Ruggiero) |

20 min
Penalties
16 min
10
Shots
60

| 14 February 2006; 18:05 | Switzerland | 1–2 (0–0, 1–2, 0–0) | Germany | Torino Esposizioni, Turin; Attendance: 2,000 |

Game reference

Patricia Elsmore-Sautter
Goalies
Jennifer Harß
Referee:
(United States) Danyel Howard
Linesmen:
(Russia) Marina Konstantinova
(Netherlands) Ilse Robben

| | 0–1 | 23:16 – M. Lanzl (Becker) |
| Schumacher (Ju. Marty) (PP) – 29:00 | 1–1 |
| | 1–2 | 29:36 – Oswald (M. Lanzl, Ritter) (PP) |

41 min
Penalties
18 min
22
Shots
31

Classification games

5th-8th classification

| 17 February 2006; 18:35 | Germany | 5–2 (3–2, 0–0, 2–0) | Italy | Torino Esposizioni, Turin; Attendance: 2,750 |

Game reference

Stephanie Wartosch-Kürten
Goalies
Debora Montanari
Referee:
(Russia) Arina Ustinova
Linesmen:
(Norway) Marte Hove
(Czech Republic) Jana Zítková

| Becker (M. Lanzl) – 00:27 | 1–0 |
| Seiler (Tamas) (PP) – 05:32 | 2–0 |
| | 2–1 | 06:18 – Leitner |
| | 2–2 | 06:59 – Leitner (Kaser, Bazzanella) |
| Holmes (Soesilo) – 07:47 | 3–2 |
| Becker (Ritter) – 42:50 | 4–2 |
| Ritter (Becker, M. Lanzl) – 55:35 | 5–2 |

22 min
Penalties
16 min
30
Shots
13

5th place game

| 20 February 2006; 13:05 | Germany | 1–0 GWS (0–0, 0–0, 0–0) (OT: 0–0) (SO: 1–0) | Russia | Torino Esposizioni, Turin; Attendance: 2,570 |

Game reference
| Jennifer Harß | Goalies | Irina Gashennikova | Referee: (United States) Danyel Howard; Linesmen: (United States) Julie Piacentini (Netherlands) Ilse Robben |
| Oswald (miss); M. Lanzl (miss); Scheytt (miss); Becker; Holmes | Shootout | (miss) Pashkevich; (miss) Smolentseva; (miss) Smolina; (miss) Kapustina | Referee: (United States) Danyel Howard; Linesmen: (United States) Julie Piacentini (Netherlands) Ilse Robben |
| 4 min | Penalties | 14 min | Referee: (United States) Danyel Howard; Linesmen: (United States) Julie Piacentini (Netherlands) Ilse Robben |
| 26 | Shots | 21 | Referee: (United States) Danyel Howard; Linesmen: (United States) Julie Piacentini (Netherlands) Ilse Robben |

== Luge ==
| Athlete | Event | Final | | | | | |
| Athlete | Event | Run 1 | Run 2 | Run 3 | Run 4 | Total | Rank |
|---|---|---|---|---|---|---|---|
| Jan Eichhorn | Men's singles | 52.103 | 51.469 | 51.656 | 51.515 | 3:26.743 | 6 |
| Georg Hackl | Men's singles | 51.856 | 51.583 | 51.806 | 51.674 | 3:26.919 | 7 |
| David Möller | Men's singles | 52.085 | 51.533 | 51.655 | 51.438 | 3:26.711 | 5 |
| Tatjana Hüfner | Women's singles | 47.109 | 47.269 | 47.101 | 46.981 | 3:08.460 | Bronze medal |
| Silke Kraushaar | Women's singles | 47.269 | 46.860 | 46.991 | 46.995 | 3:08.115 | Silver medal |
| Sylke Otto | Women's singles | 47.041 | 46.820 | 46.902 | 47.216 | 3:07.979 | Gold medal |
| Andre Florschuetz; Torsten Wustlich | Doubles | 47.141 | 47.666 | n/a | | 1:34.807 | Silver medal |
| Patric Leitner; Alexander Resch | Doubles | 47.198 | 47.762 | n/a | | 1:34.960 | 6 |

== Nordic combined ==
| Athlete | Event | Ski jumping | | Cross-country | | |
| Athlete | Event | Points | Rank | Deficit | Time | Rank |
|---|---|---|---|---|---|---|
| Ronny Ackermann | Sprint | 114.0 | 10 | 0:47 | 19:07.7 +38.7 | 8 |
| Ronny Ackermann | Individual Gundersen | 213.5 | 26 | 3:16 | 42:58.9 +3:14.3 | 18 |
| Sebastian Haseney | Sprint | 90.7 | 42 | 2:20 | 20:09.1 +1:40.1 | 29 |
| Sebastian Haseney | Individual Gundersen | 212.5 | 28 | 3:20 | 40:35.7 +51.1 | 6 |
| Georg Hettich | Sprint | 125.7 | 1 | 0:00 | 18:38.6 +9.6 | Bronze medal |
| Georg Hettich | Individual Gundersen | 262.5 | 1 | 0:00 | 39:44.6 +2:28.9 | Gold medal |
| Björn Kircheisen | Sprint | 106.5 | 21 | 1:17 | 19:05.7 +36.7 | 7 |
| Björn Kircheisen | Individual Gundersen | 224.0 | 16 | 2:34 | 40:55.1 +1:10.5 | 7 |
| Jens Gaiser; Björn Kircheisen; Ronny Ackermann; Georg Hettich | Team | 913.5 | 1 | 0:00 | 50:07.9 +15.3 | Silver medal |

Note: 'Deficit' refers to the amount of time behind the leader a competitor began the cross-country portion of the event. Italicized numbers show the final deficit from the winner's finishing time.

== Short track speed skating ==
| Athlete | Event | Heat | | Quarterfinal | | Semifinal | | Final | |
| Athlete | Event | Time | Rank | Time | Rank | Time | Rank | Time | Rank |
|---|---|---|---|---|---|---|---|---|---|
| Tyson Heung | Men's 500 m | 43.572 | 3 | did not advance | | | | | 16 |
| Tyson Heung | Men's 1500 m | 2:20.075 | 4 | did not advance | | | | | 17 |
| Aika Klein | Women's 500 m | 57.732 | 3 | did not advance | | | | | 21 |
| Aika Klein | Women's 1000 m | disqualified | | | | | | | |
| Aika Klein | Women's 1500 m | 2:42.380 | 5 | did not advance | | | | | 26 |
| Yvonne Kunze | Women's 1000 m | 1:40.166 | 3 ADV | 1:33.627 | 2 Q | 1:36.765 | 4 | Final B 1:33.627 | 7 |
| Yvonne Kunze | Women's 1500 m | 2:48.009 | 4 | did not advance | | | | | 21 |
| Arian Nachbar | Men's 500 m | 43.006 | 2 Q | 42.605 | 4 | did not advance | | | 13 |
| Arian Nachbar | Men's 1000 m | 1:27.994 | 3 ADV | 1:27.679 | 4 | did not advance | | | 14 |
| Sebastian Praus | Men's 1000 m | 1:35.375 | 3 ADV | 1:29.820 | 3 | did not advance | | | 10 |
| Sebastian Praus | Men's 1500 m | 2:30.292 | 4 | did not advance | | | | | 21 |
| Susanne Rudolph | Women's 500 m | 46.503 | 3 | did not advance | | | | | 18 |
| From: Thomas Bauer; Andre Hartwig; Tyson Heung; Arian Nachbar; Sebastian Praus | Men's 5000 m relay | n/a | | | | 7:02.367 | 3 | Final B 7:13.338 | 7 |
| From: Tina Grassow; Aika Klein; Yvonne Kunze; Christin Priebst; Susanne Rudolph | Women's 3000 m relay | n/a | | | | 4:22.553 | 4 | Final B 4:24.896 | 6 |

Key: 'ADV' indicates a skater was advanced due to being interfered with.

== Skeleton ==
| Athlete | Event | Final | | | |
| Athlete | Event | Run 1 | Run 2 | Total | Rank |
|---|---|---|---|---|---|
| Sebastian Haupt | Men's | 58.48 | 59.10 | 1:57.58 | 9 |
| Anja Huber | Women's | 1:01.12 | 1:01.44 | 2:02.56 | 8 |
| Frank Rommel | Men's | 59.94 | 1:00.41 | 2:00.35 | 24 |
| Diana Sartor | Women's | 1:00.29 | 1:01.40 | 2:01.69 | 4 |

== Ski jumping ==
| Athlete | Event | Qualifying | | First round | | Final | | |
| Athlete | Event | Points | Rank | Points | Rank | Points | Total | Rank |
|---|---|---|---|---|---|---|---|---|
| Alexander Herr | Normal hill | 125.5 | 7 Q | 119.0 | 22 Q | 112.0 | 231.0 | 21 |
| Michael Neumayer | Normal hill | 127.0 | 4 Q | 129.5 | 9 Q | 131.0 | 260.5 | 8 |
| Michael Neumayer | Large hill | 114.4 | 3 Q | 110.3 | 11 Q | 118.8 | 229.1 | 11 |
| Martin Schmitt | Large hill | 92.1 | 15 Q | 97.2 | 27 Q | 115.4 | 212.6 | 19 |
| Georg Späth | Normal hill | 123.5 | 8 PQ | 124.5 | 17 Q | 126.5 | 251.0 | 12 |
| Georg Späth | Large hill | 116.8 | 9 Q | 108.6 | 13 Q | 103.6 | 212.2 | 20 |
| Michael Uhrmann | Normal hill | 120.5 | 10 PQ | 128.0 | 10 Q | 136.0 | 264.0 | 4 |
| Michael Uhrmann | Large hill | 106.2 | 14 PQ | 106.3 | 17 Q | 108.6 | 214.9 | 16 |
| Michael Neumayer; Martin Schmitt; Michael Uhrmann; Georg Späth | Team | n/a | | 446.0 | 4 Q | 476.6 | 922.6 | 4 |

Note: PQ indicates a skier was pre-qualified for the final, based on entry rankings.

== Snowboarding ==
Halfpipe

| Athlete | Event | Qualifying run 1 | | Qualifying run 2 | | Final | | |
| Athlete | Event | Points | Rank | Points | Rank | Run 1 | Run 2 | Rank |
|---|---|---|---|---|---|---|---|---|
| Xaver Hoffmann | Men's halfpipe | 22.6 | 27 | 18.7 | 28 | did not advance | | 34 |
| Vinzenz Lueps | Men's halfpipe | 33.9 | 11 | 39.5 | 4 Q | (28.7) | 36.8 | 9 |
| Jan Michaelis | Men's halfpipe | 34.5 | 10 | 36.3 | 9 | did not advance | | 15 |
| Christophe Schmidt | Men's halfpipe | 39.4 | 6 Q | n/a | | (33.2) | 37.5 | 8 |

Note: In the final, the single best score from two runs is used to determine the ranking. A bracketed score indicates a run that wasn't counted.

Parallel GS

| Athlete | Event | Qualification | | Round of 16 | Quarterfinals | Semifinals | Finals | |
| Athlete | Event | Time | Rank | Opposition Time | Opposition Time | Opposition Time | Opposition Time | Rank |
|---|---|---|---|---|---|---|---|---|
| Patrick Bussler | Men's parallel giant slalom | 1:12.54 | 19 | did not advance | | | | 19 |
| Markus Ebner | Men's parallel giant slalom | 1:12.22 | 17 | did not advance | | | | 17 |
| Amelie Kober | Women's parallel giant slalom | 1:21.33 | 5 Q | Sauerbreij (NED) (12); W -0.03 (+1.50 -1.53) | Boldikova (RUS) (4); W -0.07 (-0.22 +0.15) | Guenther (AUT) (8); W -3.76 (-1.50 -2.26) | Meuli (SUI) (1); L +15.97 (+0.21 +15.76) | Silver medal |

Key: '+ Time' represents a deficit; the brackets indicate the results of each run.

Snowboard Cross

| Athlete | Event | Qualifying | | 1/8 finals | Quarterfinals | Semifinals | Finals | |
| Athlete | Event | Time | Rank | Position | Position | Position | Position | Rank |
|---|---|---|---|---|---|---|---|---|
| Katharina Himmler | Women's snowboard cross | 1:32.15 | 13 Q | n/a | 3 | did not advance | Classification 9-12; 4 | 12 |
| Alex Kupprion | Men's snowboard cross | 1:24.66 | 36 | did not advance | | | | 36 |
| Michael Layer | Men's snowboard cross | 1:22.43 | 23 Q | 4 | did not advance | | | 27 |
| David Speiser | Men's snowboard cross | 1:23.38 | 31 Q | 4 | did not advance | | | 32 |

== Speed skating ==
Men

| Athlete | Event | Race 1 | | Final | |
| Athlete | Event | Time | Rank | Time | Rank |
|---|---|---|---|---|---|
| Jens Boden | 5000 m | n/a | | 6:38.34 | 20 |
| Jörg Dallmann | 1500 m | n/a | | 1:51.32 | 37 |
| Stefan Heythausen | 1500 m | n/a | | 1:49.58 | 26 |
| Robert Lehmann | 1500 m | n/a | | 1:51.04 | 36 |
| Tobias Schneider | 1500 m | n/a | | 1:50.18 | 31 |

Women

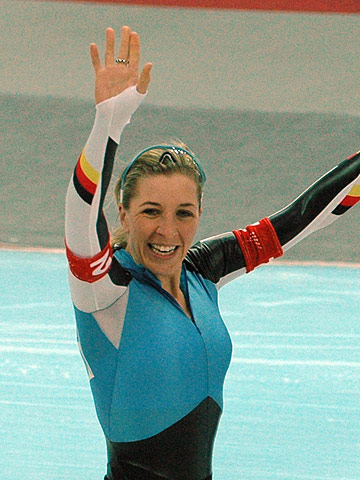
Anni Friesinger won gold in the team pursuit and bronze in the 1000 m

| Athlete | Event | Race 1 | | Final | |
| Athlete | Event | Time | Rank | Time | Rank |
|---|---|---|---|---|---|
| Daniela Anschütz-Thoms | 1500 m | n/a | | 1:59.74 | 10 |
| Daniela Anschütz-Thoms | 3000 m | n/a | | 4:06.89 | 6 |
| Daniela Anschütz-Thoms | 5000 m | n/a | | 7:02.82 | 5 |
| Anni Friesinger | 1000 m | n/a | | 1:16.11 | Bronze medal |
| Anni Friesinger | 1500 m | n/a | | 1:57.31 | 4 |
| Anni Friesinger | 3000 m | n/a | | 4:04.59 | 4 |
| Judith Hesse | 500 m | 39.64 | 39.39 | 1:19.03 | 19 |
| Judith Hesse | 1000 m | n/a | | 1:17.98 | 22 |
| Lucille Opitz | 1500 m | n/a | | 2:02.75 | 30 |
| Lucille Opitz | 5000 m | n/a | | 7:18.06 | 14 |
| Claudia Pechstein | 3000 m | n/a | | 4:05.54 | 5 |
| Claudia Pechstein | 5000 m | n/a | | 7:00.08 | Silver medal |
| Sabine Völker | 1000 m | n/a | | 1:17.97 | 21 |
| Judith Hesse | 500 m | 38.70 | 38.55 | 1:17.25 | 6 |
| Pamela Zöllner | 500 m | 40.16 | 3940 | 1:19.56 | 24 |
| Pamela Zöllner | 1000 m | n/a | | 1:19.30 | 30 |

Team Pursuit

| Athlete | Event | Seeding | | Quarterfinal | Semifinal | Final | |
| Athlete | Event | Time | Rank | Opposition Time | Opposition Time | Opposition Time | Rank |
|---|---|---|---|---|---|---|---|
| From: Jens Boden; Jörg Dallmann; Stefan Heythausen; Robert Lehmann; Tobias Schneider | Men's team pursuit | 3:49.59 | 5 | Norway (4); L 3:49.68 | n/a | 7th place final Japan (8); W 3:48.28 | 7 |
| From: Daniela Anschütz-Thoms; Anni Friesinger; Lucille Opitz; Claudia Pechstein; Sabine Völker | Women's team pursuit | 3:07.07 | 5 | Netherlands (4); W 3:07.07 | Russia (1); W 3:02.72 | Canada (3); W 3:01.25 | Gold medal |

== Further references ==
- (in German) NOK-Präsidium nominiert weitere 135 Aktive für die Olympischen Winterspiele - 162 Sportlerinnen und Sportler nach Turin from nok.de, retrieved 25 January 2006
- (in German) 27 Turin Tickets vergeben - Präsidium benennt Dr. Clemens Prokop als Vertreter für Findungskommission des DOSB-Präsidiums from nok.de, retrieved 25 January 2006
