= Jeanette Marty =

Swiss ice hockey player

- Born: 11 August 1975 (age 49); Zug, Switzerland
- Height: 173 cm (5 ft 8 in)
- Weight: 74 kg (163 lb; 11 st 9 lb)
- Position: Forward
- Shot: Left
- Played for: EV Zug
- National team: Switzerland
- Playing career: 1991–2008

Jeanette Marty (born 11 August 1975) is a Swiss ice hockey player. She competed in the women's tournament at the 2006 Winter Olympics.
