= Denise Soesilo =

German ice hockey player (born 1987)

- Born: May 10, 1987 (age 39) Hamburg, West Germany
- Height: 5 ft 6 in (168 cm)
- Weight: 110 lb (50 kg; 7 st 12 lb)
- Position: Forward
- SWHL team: CP Meyrin Femmes
- National team: Germany
- Playing career: 2005–present

Denise Soesilo (born May 10, 1987 in Hamburg, West Germany) is a German ice hockey player. She was forward position. She played for the Yale Bulldogs and was the first Yale women's hockey player to compete in the Olympics, along with her Yale teammate Helen Resor.

== Playing career ==
=== Germany ===
She represented Germany in the Germany women's national ice hockey team at the Winter Olympic Games. She competed in the 2006 Olympics.

== Career stats ==
=== Olympics ===
Event	Games played	G	A	Pts	PIM
2006 Olympics	5	0	1	1	0

=== NCAA ===
Year	Games played	G	A	Pts
2006-07	30	7	6	13
2007-08	8	1	3	4

== See also ==
- Germany women's national ice hockey team
