= Silvia Bruggmann =

Swiss ice hockey player

- Born: 20 February 1978 (age 47) Lütisburg, St. Gallen, Switzerland
- Height: 167 cm (5 ft 6 in)
- Weight: 58 kg (128 lb; 9 st 2 lb)
- Position: Forward
- Shot: Left
- Played for: DSC Oberthurgau; EV Zug; ZSC Lions; SC Reinach
- National team: Switzerland
- Playing career: 1999–2017

Silvia Bruggmann (born 20 February 1978) is a Swiss ice hockey player and former member of the Swiss national team. She competed in the women's tournament at the 2006 Winter Olympics and participated in five IIHF Women's World Championship tournaments – two in Division I and three in the Top Division.

== Playing career ==
Bruggmann spent the majority of her club career in the Leistungsklasse A (LK A or LKA), which was later called the Swiss Women's Hockey League A (SWHL A; 2014–2019) and rebranded as Women's League in 2019. She won the 1999–2000 LK A Swiss Championship with DSC St. Gallen and continued with the club when it rebranded as DSC Oberthurgau in 2002.

In 2004, she left DSC Oberthurgau to join EV Zug Damen, with whom she won the 2004–05 LK A Swiss Championship and claimed a bronze medal in the 2004 IIHF European Women's Champions Cup. She remained with the team as its parent club was changed in 2007 from the Zug-based EV Zug to Küssnachter SC (KSC), based in Küssnacht am Rigi in the canton of Schwyz, and the team was renamed Küssnachter SC Damen (also known as KSC Küssnacht am Rigi Damen).

When the Küssnachter SC Damen was dissolved in 2009 due to difficulties recruiting players, Bruggmann joined the Zurich-based ZSC Lions Frauen. The team won the regular season, suffering only one loss in eighteen games, to which Bruggman contributed 21 points on fourteen goals and seven assists. Across four playoff games, she notched two assists as the Lions fell in the Swiss Championship final to Ladies Team Lugano. The 2009–10 season was the last full season she played in the LK A.

After several years away from the LK A, Bruggmann played three games during the 2012–13 regular season with SC Reinach Damen.

== Personal life ==
Bruggmann was born in Lütisburg, a small municipality in Wahlkreis Toggenburg of the canton St. Gallen on 20 February 1978.

As of 2024, Bruggmann plays amateur ice hockey with the representative team of EC Wil in the 1. Liga of the Regio League. She also serves as a coach with EC Wil, which is based in Wil, St. Gallen.
