= Sandrine Ray =

Swiss ice hockey player

- Born: 11 May 1983 (age 42); Orbe, Switzerland
- Height: 163 cm (5 ft 4 in)
- Weight: 60 kg (132 lb; 9 st 6 lb)
- Position: Forward
- Shot: Left
- Played for: Lugano
- National team: Switzerland
- Playing career: 1998–2015

Sandrine Ray (born 11 May 1983) is a Swiss ice hockey player. She competed in the women's tournament at the 2006 Winter Olympics.
