= Rachel Rochat =

Swiss ice hockey player

- Born: 10 September 1972 (age 53) Summit, New Jersey, United States
- Height: 5 ft 11 in (180 cm)
- Weight: 150 lb (68 kg; 10 st 10 lb)
- Position: Forward
- Shot: Left
- Played for: SC Lyss Damen
- National team: Switzerland
- Playing career: 1994–2007

Rachel Rochat (born 10 September 1972) is a Swiss-American former ice hockey player. She competed for the Swiss national team in women's tournament at the 2006 Winter Olympics.

Raised in Bernardsville, New Jersey, and attended the Pingry School, where she competed as a part of the boys' hockey team.
