= Laura Ruhnke =

Swiss ice hockey player

- Born: 25 December 1983 (age 41); Bern, Switzerland
- Height: 5 ft 8 in (173 cm)
- Weight: 163 lb (74 kg; 11 st 9 lb)
- Position: Forward
- Shoots: Right
- National team: Switzerland
- Playing career: 2000–present

Laura Ruhnke (born 25 December 1983) is a Swiss ice hockey player. She competed in the women's tournament at the 2006 Winter Olympics.
