= Maria Leitner (ice hockey) =

Italian ice hockey player (born 1981)

Personal information
- Nationality: Italian
- Born: 30 December 1981 (age 43); Vipiteno, Italy

Sport
- Sport: Ice hockey

Maria Leitner (born 30 December 1981) is an Italian ice hockey player. She competed in the women's tournament at the 2006 Winter Olympics.
