= Nikola Holmes =

German ice hockey player

Personal information
- Nationality: German
- Born: 18 February 1981 (age 44); Bellflower, California, United States

Sport
- Sport: Ice hockey

Nikola Holmes (born 18 February 1981) is a German ice hockey player. She competed in the women's tournament at the 2006 Winter Olympics.
