= Prisca Mosimann =

Swiss ice hockey player

- Born: 19 March 1975 (age 50); Langenthal, Switzerland
- Height: 184 cm (6 ft 0 in)
- Weight: 73 kg (161 lb; 11 st 7 lb)
- Position: Defence
- Shot: Left
- Played for: Lugano
- National team: Switzerland
- Playing career: 1988–2010

Prisca Mosimann (born 19 March 1975) is a Swiss former ice hockey player. She competed in the women's tournament at the 2006 Winter Olympics.
