= Jenny Tamas =

German ice hockey player

Personal information
- Nationality: German
- Born: 18 January 1990 (age 35); Herford, Germany

Sport
- Sport: Ice hockey

Jenny Tamas (born 18 January 1990) is a German ice hockey player. She competed in the women's tournament at the 2006 Winter Olympics. She was the youngest player on the German ice hockey team at age 16.
