= Sandra Cattaneo =

Swiss ice hockey player

- Born: 25 January 1975 (age 50); Zürich, Switzerland
- Height: 166 cm (5 ft 5 in)
- Weight: 64 kg (141 lb; 10 st 1 lb)
- Position: Forward
- Shot: Left
- Played for: EHC Illnau-Effretikon
- National team: Switzerland
- Playing career: 1991–2023

Sandra Cattaneo (born 25 January 1975) is a Swiss ice hockey player. She competed in the women's tournament at the 2006 Winter Olympics.
