= Waltraud Kaser =

Italian ice hockey player (born 1980)

- Born: 3 July 1980 (age 45) Bressanone, Italy
- Height: 1.70 m (5 ft 7 in)
- Position: Forward
- Shoots: Left
- IHLW team Former teams: HC Toblach Icebears; HC Eagles Bolzano; EV Bozen Eagles
- National team: Italy
- Playing career: 1996–present

Waltraud Kaser (born 3 July 1980) is an Italian ice hockey player for the HC Toblach Icebears of the Italian Hockey League Women (IHLW). She represented Italy in the women's ice hockey tournament at the 2006 Winter Olympics and at eight IIHF Women's World Championships, participating in Division I and Division II tournaments.
