= Ruth Künzle =

Swiss ice hockey player and official (born 1972)

- Born: 29 March 1972 (age 54) Waldkirch, Switzerland
- Height: 166 cm (5 ft 5 in)
- Weight: 65 kg (143 lb; 10 st 3 lb)
- Position: Defense
- Shot: Right
- Played for: EV Zug; HC Lugano; Nacka HK
- National team: Switzerland
- Playing career: 1991–2010
Medal record
European Championship
Bronze medal – third place	1995 Latvia

Ruth Künzle (born 29 March 1972) is a Swiss ice hockey official and retired defenseman. Her playing career with the Swiss national team spanned 214 international matches and included the women's tournament at the 2006 Winter Olympics, in addition to nine IIHF Women's World Championship tournaments and four IIHF European Women Championships.

== Playing career ==
Künzle spent all but one season of her nearly twenty-season club career in the Leistungsklasse A (LKA; called the Swiss Women's Hockey League A during 2014 to 2019 and known as Women's League since 2019), playing with the EV Zug Damen until joining HC Lugano ahead of the 2004–05 season. At the time of her retirement in 2010, Künzle had amassed seven Swiss Championship titles between the two clubs.
