= Luana Frasnelli =

Italian ice hockey player

Personal information
- Nationality: Italian
- Born: 25 July 1975 (age 50) Bolzano, Italy

Sport
- Sport: Ice hockey

Luana Frasnelli (born 25 July 1975) is a retired Italian ice hockey goaltender. She competed in the women's tournament at the 2006 Winter Olympics.

== Career statistics ==
=== International ===
Year	Team	Event	Result	GP	W	L	T/OT	MIN	GA	SO	GAA	SV%
2006	Italy	OG	8th	3	0	0	0	80:00	17	0	12.75	0.750
