= Ice hockey at the 2006 Winter Olympics – Women's tournament =

2006 Winter Olympics

Tournament details
- Host country: Italy
- Venues: 2 (in 1 host city)
- Dates: 11–20 February
- Teams: 8

Final positions
- Champions: Canada (2nd title)
- Runners-up: Sweden
- Third place: United States
- Fourth place: Finland

Tournament statistics
- Games played: 20
- Goals scored: 136 (6.8 per game)
- Attendance: 91,609 (4,580 per game)
- Scoring leader: (Canada) Hayley Wickenheiser (17 points)

Awards
- MVP: (Canada) Hayley Wickenheiser

The women's tournament in ice hockey at the 2006 Winter Olympics was held in Turin, Italy from 11 to 20 February 2006. Eight countries qualified for the tournament, competing across two preliminary groups before a placement round and playoff round determined the final standings. Canada won its second consecutive gold medal, defeating Sweden 4–1 in the final. The United States won the bronze medal by defeating Finland 4–0.

Hayley Wickenheiser of Canada was named the tournament's Most Valuable Player and finished as the leading scorer with 17 points. Canada's Charline Labonté posted the best save percentage among goaltenders with 97.62%. Sweden's Kim Martin was selected as the best goaltender by the directorate, while the United States' Angela Ruggiero was named best defenceman.

== Qualification ==
Canada, United States, Finland and Sweden qualified as the top four teams in the IIHF World Ranking in 2004. Italy qualified as host team. The remaining three teams qualified from qualification tournaments.

Event	Date	Location	Vacancies	Qualified
Host			1	Italy
2004 IIHF World Ranking	5 March 2001 – 6 April 2004	(Canada) Halifax	4	Canada; United States; Finland; Sweden
Qualification tournament	11–13 November 2004	(Russia) Podolsk	1	Russia
Qualification tournament	11–14 November 2004	(Germany) Bad Tölz	1	Germany
Qualification tournament	11–14 November 2004	(China) Beijing	1	Switzerland
Total			8	

Notes

1. ^{a} 2004 IIHF World Ranking were comprising the following events: 2000 World Championship, 2001 World Championship, 2002 Winter Olympic Games and 2004 World Championship.
2. ^{b} Halifax was the site for 2004 World Championship; at the conclusion of the tournament the ranking were finalized with regards to the qualification slots.

== Preliminary round ==
All times are local (UTC+1).

=== Group A ===
Pos	Team	Pld	W	D	L	GF	GA	GD	Pts	Qualification
1	Canada	3	3	0	0	36	1	+35	6	Semifinals
2	Sweden	3	2	0	1	15	9	+6	4	Semifinals
3	Russia	3	1	0	2	6	16	−10	2	5–8th place semifinals
4	Italy (H)	3	0	0	3	1	32	−31	0	5–8th place semifinals

(H) Hosts

11 February 2006; 15:35	Sweden	3–1 (0–0, 2–1, 1–0)	Russia	Palasport Olimpico, Turin; Attendance: 6,500

Game reference

Kim Martin
Goalies
Irina Gashennikova
Referee:
(Canada) Stephanie Normand
Linesmen:
(Germany) Michaela Kiefer
(United States) Julie Piacentini

Jansson (Lindberg, Winberg) (PP) – 23:26	1–0
Timglas (Rooth, O'Konor) (PP) – 25:14	2–0
	2–1	39:21 – Trefilova
Rooth (G. Andersson) (PP) – 40:32	3–1

14 min
Penalties
14 min
24
Shots
31

11 February 2006; 20:35	Canada	16–0 (5–0, 4–0, 7–0)	Italy	Palasport Olimpico, Turin; Attendance: 8,399

Game reference

Kim St-Pierre
Goalies
Debora Montanari
Luana Frasnelli
Referee:
(United States) Danyel Howard
Linesmen:
(Finland) Sanna Mattila
(Netherlands) Ilse Robben

Ouellette (Hefford, MacLeod) – 01:36	1–0
Ouellette (Hefford, Botterill) – 01:52	2–0
Wickenheiser (Piper) – 04:04	3–0
Ouellette (Botterill, Campbell) (PP) – 06:53	4–0
Pounder (Kellar) – 11:34	5–0
Vaillancourt (Piper) – 20:25	6–0
MacLeod (Campbell, Apps) – 22:32	7–0
Piper (Wickenheiser, Apps) – 38:45	8–0
Wickenheiser (Piper, Apps) – 39:56	9–0
Apps (Piper, Wickenheiser) – 41:35	10–0
Botterill (Ouellette, MacLeod) – 47:31	11–0
Hefford (Ouellette, Botterill) (PP) – 48:41	12–0
Pounder – 49:42	13–0
Goyette (Campbell, Sunohara) – 52:19	14–0
Apps (Piper, Wickenheiser) (PP) – 56:15	15–0
Weatherston (Agosta, Vaillancourt) – 57:37	16–0

8 min
Penalties
10 min
66
Shots
5

12 February 2006; 16:35	Russia	0–12 (0–7, 0–2, 0–3)	Canada	Torino Esposizioni, Turin; Attendance: 2,414

Game reference

Irina Gashennikova
Nadezhda Alexandrova
Goalies
Charline Labonte
Referee:
(United Kingdom) Joy Tottman
Linesmen:
(Finland) Johanna Suban
(Czech Republic) Jana Zítková

0–1	04:53 – Sunohara (Ouellette, Goyette)
0–2	06:52 – Agosta (Kinsbury, Weatherston)
0–3	10:00 – Piper (Apps) (SH)
0–4	15:14 – Goyette (Campbell)
0–5	16:18 – Piper (Wickenheiser)
0–6	17:48 – Wickenheiser (SH)
0–7	19:20 – Agosta (Vaillancourt)
0–8	27:19 – Weatherston (Ouellette, Vaillancourt)
0–9	33:27 – Agosta (PP)
0–10	41:16 – Piper (Wickenheiser)
0–11	47:47 – Vaillancourt (Hefford, Botterill)
0–12	52:33 – MacLeod (Wickenheiser)

28 min
Penalties
14 min
17
Shots
43

13 February 2006; 15:05	Sweden	11–0 (3–0, 5–0, 3–0)	Italy	Torino Esposizioni, Turin; Attendance: 2,156

Game reference

Cecilia Andersson
Goalies
Debora Montanari
Luana Frasnelli
Referee:
(Czech Republic) Kateřina Ivičičová
Linesmen:
(Norway) Marte Hove
(Finland) Johanna Suban

Sjolander (Winberg) (PP) – 07:09	1–0
Sjolander (Lindberg, Asserholt) (PP) – 15:45	2–0
G. Andersson (Holst) – 18:15	3–0
Jansson (Eliasson) – 20:59	4–0
Holst (Rooth) – 25:05	5–0
Edstrand (Sjolander) – 31:45	6–0
Rooth (Holst) (SH) – 32:37	7–0
G. Andersson (Nevalainen) – 34:16	8–0
Sjolander (Nevalainen, Asserholt) – 49:31	9–0
Rooth (G. Andersson) (PP) – 50:55	10–0
Edstrand (Rooth, G. Andersson) (PP) – 58:08	11–0

16 min
Penalties
22 min
52
Shots
4

14 February 2006; 13:05	Italy	1–5 (1–1, 0–1, 0–3)	Russia	Torino Esposizioni, Turin; Attendance: 2,046

Debora Montanari
Goalies
Irina Gashennikova
Referee:
(Germany) Bianca Walter
Linesmen:
(France) Anne-Sophie Boniface
(Germany) Michaela Kiefer

Florian (Leitner, Bettarini) (PP2) – 8:02	1–0
	1–1	11:17 – Gladysheva (PP)
	1–2	25:51 – Trefilova (Pashkevich) (PP)
	1–3	44:31 – Gavrilova (Khomich) (PP)
	1–4	46:53 – Gavrilova (Sotnikova)
	1–5	53:04 – Trefilova (Shchelchkova) (PP)

26 min
Penalties
18 min
13
Shots
40

14 February 2006; 15:35	Canada	8–1 (2–0, 5–1, 1–0)	Sweden	Palasport Olimpico, Turin; Attendance: 6,850

Game reference

Kim St-Pierre
Goalies
Cecilia Andersson
Referee:
(Finland) Anu Hirvonen
Linesmen:
(Finland) Sanna Mattila
(United States) Julie Piacentini

Apps – 04:36	1–0
Wickenheiser (Pounder) – 12:28	2–0
Apps (PP) – 23:53	3–0
Apps (Wickenheiser, Piper) – 30:58	4–0
Goyette (Piper, Campbell) (PP) – 34:02	5–0
	5–1	36:12 – Lindberg (Jansson, Winberg) (PP)
Weatherston (Kingsbury) – 37:25	6–1
Hefford (PP) – 38:53	7–1
Goyette (Piper, Wickenheiser) (PP) – 46:02	8–1

14 min
Penalties
16 min
47
Shots
8

=== Group B ===
Pos	Team	Pld	W	D	L	GF	GA	GD	Pts	Qualification
1	United States	3	3	0	0	18	3	+15	6	Semifinals
2	Finland	3	2	0	1	10	7	+3	4	Semifinals
3	Germany	3	1	0	2	2	9	−7	2	5–8th place semifinals
4	Switzerland	3	0	0	3	1	12	−11	0	5–8th place semifinals

11 February 2006; 13:05	Finland	3–0 (2–0, 0–0, 1–0)	Germany	Torino Esposizioni, Turin; Attendance: 3,200

Game reference

Maija Hassinen
Goalies
Stephanie Wartosch-Kürten
Referee:
(Russia) Arina Ustinova
Linesmen:
(France) Anne-Sophie Boniface
(Czech Republic) Klára Quagliato

Pehkonen (Pelttari, Tuominen) – 08:15	1–0
Pelttari (PP2) – 17:02	2–0
Pälvilä (SH) – 43:13	3–0

4 min
Penalties
6 min
27
Shots
24

11 February 2006; 18:05	United States	6–0 (1–0, 1–0, 4–0)	Switzerland	Torino Esposizioni, Turin; Attendance: 2,900

Game reference

Chanda Gunn
Goalies
Patricia Elsmore-Sautter
Referee:
(Czech Republic) Kateřina Ivičičová
Linesmen:
(Russia) Marina Konstantinova
(Canada) Kim Robichaud

Ka. King (Potter) – 02:38	1–0
Dunn-Luoma (SH2) – 32:27	2–0
Wendell (Ruggiero, Potter) – 47:53	3–0
Darwitz (Parsons) – 50:33	4–0
Wendell (Potter) – 52:40	5–0
Potter (Ruggiero) (PP) – 58:50	6–0

18 min
Penalties
14 min
56
Shots
9

12 February 2006; 19:05	Germany	0–5 (0–2, 0–2, 0–1)	United States	Palasport Olimpico, Turin; Attendance: 7,794

Game reference

Jennifer Harß
Goalies
Pam Dreyer
Referee:
(Finland) Anu Hirvonen
Linesmen:
(Sweden) Annica Flödén
(Norway) Marte Hove

0–1	04:33 – Potter (Ka. King) (PP)
0–2	17:13 – Ka. King (Chu, Potter) (PP)
0–3	21:11 – Parsons (Resor, Stephens)
0–4	29:57 – Darwitz (Parsons, Ka. King)
0–5	50:54 – Parsons (Ruggiero)

20 min
Penalties
16 min
10
Shots
60

13 February 2006; 17:35	Finland	4–0 (1–0, 0–0, 3–0)	Switzerland	Palasport Olimpico, Turin; Attendance: 4,259

Game reference

Noora Räty
Goalies
Florence Schelling
Referee:
(Germany) Bianca Walter
Linesmen:
(Sweden) Annica Flödén
(Czech Republic) Jana Zítková

Tuominen (Pelttari) (PP) – 14:10	1–0
Rantamäki – 45:21	2–0
Saarinen (Hoikkala, Tallus) – 51:58	3–0
Pehkonen (Rantamaki) – 52:50	4–0

18 min
Penalties
20 min
41
Shots
18

14 February 2006; 18:05	Switzerland	1–2 (0–0, 1–2, 0–0)	Germany	Torino Esposizioni, Turin; Attendance: 2,000

Game reference

Patricia Elsmore-Sautter
Goalies
Jennifer Harß
Referee:
(United States) Danyel Howard
Linesmen:
(Russia) Marina Konstantinova
(Netherlands) Ilse Robben

	0–1	23:16 – M. Lanzl (Becker)
Schumacher (Ju. Marty) (PP) – 29:00	1–1
	1–2	29:36 – Oswald (M. Lanzl, Ritter) (PP)

41 min
Penalties
18 min
22
Shots
31

14 February 2006; 20:35	United States	7–3 (1–2, 1–1, 5–0)	Finland	Palasport Olimpico, Turin; Attendance: 7,697

Game reference

Chanda Gunn
Goalies
Maija Hassinen
Referee:
(Canada) Stephanie Normand
Linesmen:
(Czech Republic) Klára Quagliato
(Canada) Kim Robichaud

	0–1	00:13 – Pehkonen (Rantamäki)
Parsons (Wendell, Potter) (PP) – 08:08	1–1
	1–2	11:26 – Laaksonen (Tuominen) (PP)
	1–3	32:01 – Kovalainen (Saarinen) (PP2)
Parsons (Chu) – 38:54	2–3
Ka. King – 41:28	3–3
Ruggiero – 50:16	4–3
Darwitz (Wall) (PP) – 51:01	5–3
Wendell (Parsons, Ruggiero) – 52:18	6–3
Ruggiero (Darwitz, Stephens) – 55:36	7–3

38 min
Penalties
22 min
31
Shots
15

== Placement round ==
=== Bracket ===
5–8th place semifinals
B3	Germany	5
A4	Italy	2
A3	Russia	6
B4	Switzerland	2

5th place game
B3	Germany (GWS)	1
A3	Russia	0
7th place game
B4	Switzerland	11
A4	Italy	0

=== 5–8th place semifinals ===
17 February 2006; 13:05	Russia	6–2 (1–1, 4–1, 1–0)	Switzerland	Torino Esposizioni, Turin; Attendance: 2,800

Game reference

Irina Gashennikova
Goalies
Patricia Elsmore-Sautter
Florence Schelling
Referee:
(Czech Republic) Kateřina Ivičičová
Linesmen:
(France) Anne-Sophie Boniface
(Sweden) Annica Flödén

Trefilova – 02:03	1–0
	1–1	10:52 – Rochat
Burina (Mishina, Barykina) – 25:14	2–1
Mishina (Smolentseva) – 26:19	3–1
Mishina (Byalkovskaya) (PP) – 30:00	4–1
	4–2	31:55 – Lehmann (Cattaneo, Bullo)
Mishina (Smolentseva) – 39:18	5–2
Kapustina (Shchelchkova) (PP) – 52:17	6–2

16 min
Penalties
12 min
36
Shots
18

17 February 2006; 18:35	Germany	5–2 (3–2, 0–0, 2–0)	Italy	Torino Esposizioni, Turin; Attendance: 2,750

Game reference

Stephanie Wartosch-Kürten
Goalies
Debora Montanari
Referee:
(Russia) Arina Ustinova
Linesmen:
(Norway) Marte Hove
(Czech Republic) Jana Zítková

Becker (M. Lanzl) – 00:27	1–0
Seiler (Tamas) (PP) – 05:32	2–0
	2–1	06:18 – Leitner
	2–2	06:59 – Leitner (Kaser, Bazzanella)
Holmes (Soesilo) – 07:47	3–2
Becker (Ritter) – 42:50	4–2
Ritter (Becker, M. Lanzl) – 55:35	5–2

22 min
Penalties
16 min
30
Shots
13

=== Seventh place game ===
20 February 2006; 13:05	Switzerland	11–0 (4–0, 6–0, 1–0)	Italy	Torino Esposizioni, Turin; Attendance: 2,500

Game reference

Florence Schelling
Goalies
Luana Frasnelli
Debora Montanari
Referee:
(Canada) Stephanie Normand
Linesmen:
(Russia) Marina Konstantinova
(Finland) Sanna Mattila

Diaz – 04:33	1–0
Diaz (Mosimann) (PP) – 09:54	2–0
Ju. Marty (Diaz) (PP) – 16:06	3–0
Lehmann (S. Marty) – 16:41	4–0
Ruhnke (Rochat) – 22:36	5–0
Ju. Marty (Ruhnke) – 26:51	6–0
Meier (Kunzle) – 31:09	7–0
Lehmann (Mosimann) – 32:48	8–0
Ruhnke (Rochat) – 33:16	9–0
S. Marty (Lehmann) – 35:37	10–0
S. Marty (Lehmann) – 56:08	11–0

20 min
Penalties
20 min
53
Shots
29

=== Fifth place game ===
20 February 2006; 13:05	Germany	1–0 GWS (0–0, 0–0, 0–0) (OT: 0–0) (SO: 1–0)	Russia	Torino Esposizioni, Turin; Attendance: 2,570

Game reference
Jennifer Harß	Goalies	Irina Gashennikova	Referee: (United States) Danyel Howard; Linesmen: (United States) Julie Piacentini (Netherlands) Ilse Robben
Oswald (miss); M. Lanzl (miss); Scheytt (miss); Becker; Holmes	Shootout	(miss) Pashkevich; (miss) Smolentseva; (miss) Smolina; (miss) Kapustina	Referee: (United States) Danyel Howard; Linesmen: (United States) Julie Piacentini (Netherlands) Ilse Robben
4 min	Penalties	14 min	Referee: (United States) Danyel Howard; Linesmen: (United States) Julie Piacentini (Netherlands) Ilse Robben
26	Shots	21	Referee: (United States) Danyel Howard; Linesmen: (United States) Julie Piacentini (Netherlands) Ilse Robben

== Playoff round ==
=== Bracket ===
Semifinals
A1	United States	2
B2	Sweden (GWS)	3
B1	Canada	6
A2	Finland	0

Gold medal game
B2	Sweden	1
B1	Canada	4
Bronze medal game
A2	Finland	0
A1	United States	4

=== Semifinals ===
17 February 2006; 17:05	United States	2–3 GWS (1–0, 1–2, 0–0) (OT: 0–0) (SO: 0–1)	Sweden	Palasport Olimpico, Turin; Attendance: 5,654

Game reference

Chanda Gunn
Goalies
Kim Martin
Referee:
(United Kingdom) Joy Tottman
Linesmen:
(Finland) Sanna Mattila
(Finland) Johanna Suban

Kr. King (Potter, Chu) (PP) – 11:55	1–0
Stephens (Wall, Darwitz) (PP) – 21:04	2–0
	2–1	26:17 – Rooth (O'Konor)
	2–2	29:40 – Rooth (Holst) (SH)

Darwitz (miss)
Potter (miss)
Ruggiero (miss)
Wendell (miss)
Shootout
(miss) Holst
(miss) Jansson
Winberg
Rooth
12 min
Penalties
22 min
39
Shots
18

17 February 2006; 21:05	Canada	6–0 (2–0, 2–0, 2–0)	Finland	Palasport Olimpico, Turin; Attendance: 7,306

Game reference

Charline Labonté
Goalies
Maija Hassinen
Noora Räty
Referee:
(United States) Danyel Howard
Linesmen:
(United States) Julie Piacentini
(Czech Republic) Klára Quagliato

Weatherston (Sostorics) (PP) – 17:33	1–0
Apps (Kingsbury, Goyette) (PP) – 19:15	2–0
Wickenheiser (Apps) (PP) – 34:59	3–0
Ouellette (Sunohara) (PP) – 36:26	4–0
Piper (Wickenheiser, Apps) – 47:49	5–0
Piper (Wickenheiser, Apps) (PP) – 54:47	6–0

14 min
Penalties
16 min
40
Shots
17

=== Bronze medal game ===
20 February 2006; 16:35	Finland	0–4 (0–3, 0–1, 0–0)	United States (bronze)	Palasport Olimpico, Turin; Attendance: 5,150

Game reference

Noora Räty
Maija Hassinen
Goalies
Chanda Gunn
Referee:
(United Kingdom) Joy Tottman
Linesmen:
(Germany) Michaela Kiefer
(Canada) Kim Robichaud

0–1	02:32 – Stephens (Chu, Darwitz) (PP)
0–2	08:09 – Ka. King (Resor)
0–3	11:06 – Ka. King (Potter)
0–4	21:44 – Ka. King (Chu, Kr. King)

12 min
Penalties
20 min
14
Shots
20

=== Gold medal game ===
20 February 2006; 20:35	(silver) Sweden	1–4 (0–2, 0–2, 1–0)	Canada (gold)	Palasport Olimpico, Turin; Attendance: 6,664

Game reference

Kim Martin
Goalies
Charline Labonté
Referee:
(Finland) Anu Hirvonen
Linesmen:
(Czech Republic) Klára Quagliato
(Finland) Johanna Suban

	0–1	03:15 – Apps (Wickenheiser)
	0–2	12:13 – Ouellette (Hefford, Botterill)
	0–3	28:58 – Piper (Wickenheiser, Pounder)
	0–4	30:27 – Hefford (Botterill, Vaillancourt)
G. Andersson (Holst, Rooth) (PP) – 45:24	1–4

6 min
Penalties
12 min
8
Shots
26

== Final ranking ==
Rank	Team
1st place, gold medalist(s)	Canada
2nd place, silver medalist(s)	Sweden
3rd place, bronze medalist(s)	United States
4	Finland
5	Germany
6	Russia
7	Switzerland
8	Italy

== Statistics ==
=== Leading scorers ===
Rank	Player	GP	G	A	Pts	PIM	+/−	POS
1	(Canada) Hayley Wickenheiser	5	5	12	17	6	+15	F
2	(Canada) Cherie Piper	5	7	8	15	0	+15	F
3	(Canada) Gillian Apps	5	7	7	14	14	+13	F
4	(Canada) Caroline Ouellette	5	5	4	9	4	+12	F
4	(Sweden) Maria Rooth	5	5	4	9	2	+1	F
6	(United States) Jenny Potter	5	2	7	9	4	+10	F
7	(United States) Katie King	5	6	2	8	2	+6	F
8	(United States) Sarah Parsons	5	4	3	7	0	+9	F
9	(Canada) Jayna Hefford	5	3	4	7	0	+8	F
10	(Canada) Jennifer Botterill	5	1	6	7	4	+6	F

GP = Games played; G = Goals; A = Assists; Pts = Points; PIM = Penalties in minutes; +/− = P Plus–minus; POS = Position
Source: IIHF.com

=== Goaltending leaders ===
Only the top five goaltenders, based on save percentage, who have played at least 40% of their team's minutes, are included in this list.

Rank	Player	TOI	GA	GAA	SA	Sv%	SO
1	(Canada) Charline Labonte	180:00	1	0.33	42	97.62	2
2	(Germany) Jennifer Harß	190:00	6	1.89	103	94.17	1
3	(Switzerland) Florence Schelling	150:00	6	2.40	90	93.33	1
4	(Canada) Kim St-Pierre	120:00	1	0.50	13	92.31	1
5	(Sweden) Kim Martin	190:00	7	2.21	96	92.71	0

TOI = Time on Ice (minutes:seconds); GA = Goals against; GAA = Goals against average; SA = Shots against; Sv% = Save percentage; SO = Shutouts
Source:IIHF.com

== Awards ==
- Most Valuable Player: (Canada) Hayley Wickenheiser
- Best players selected by the directorate:
  - Best Goaltender: (Sweden) Kim Martin
  - Best Defenceman: (United States) Angela Ruggiero
  - Best Forward: (Canada) Hayley Wickenheiser

Source: IIHF.com

- Media All-Stars
  - Goaltender: (Sweden) Kim Martin
  - Defencemen: (United States) Angela Ruggiero, (Canada) Carla MacLeod
  - Forwards: (Sweden) Maria Rooth, (Canada) Hayley Wickenheiser, (Canada) Gillian Apps

Source: IIHF.com
