= Debora Montanari =

Italian ice hockey player

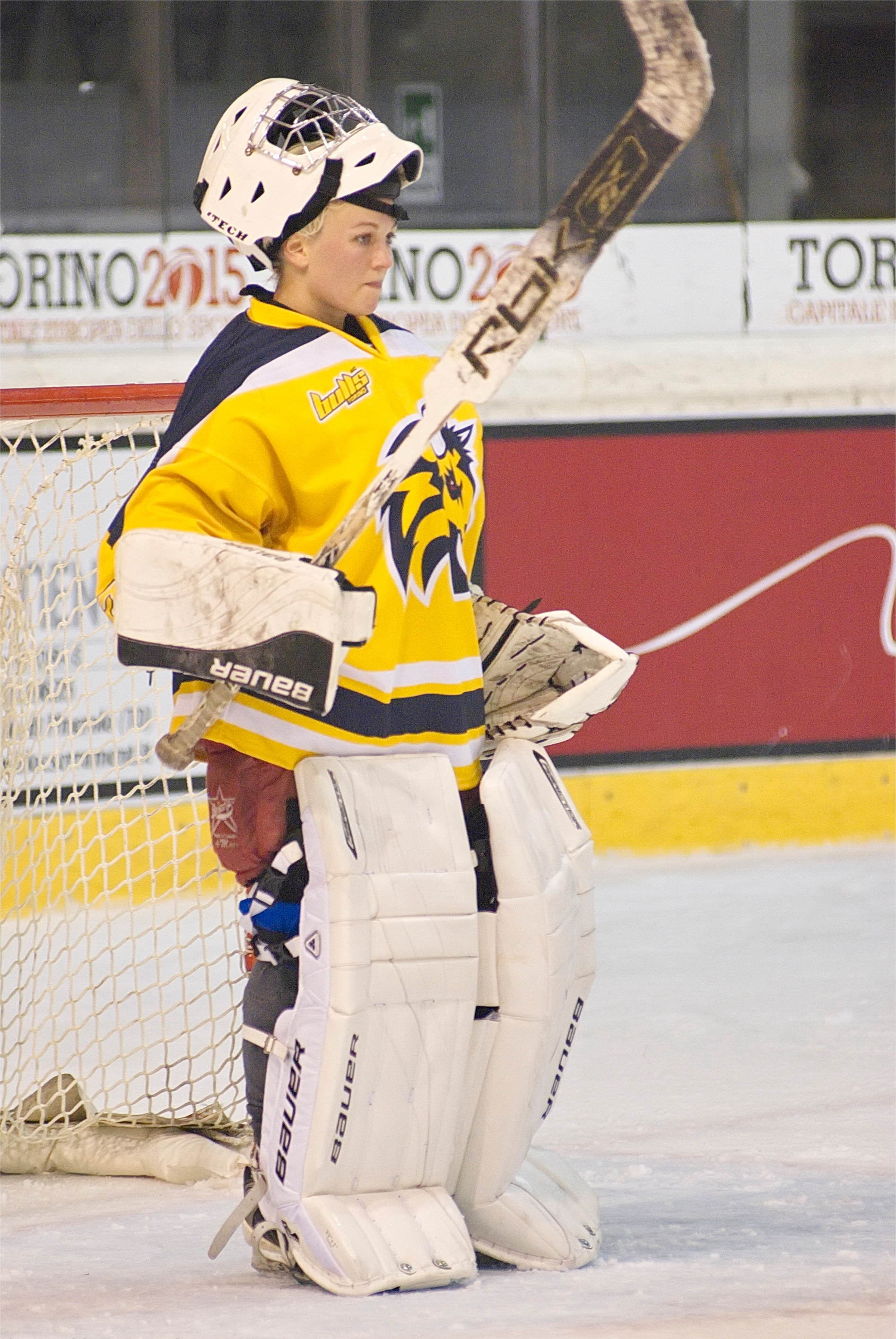

Personal information
- Nationality: Italian
- Born: 17 November 1980 (age 45) Pinerolo, Italy

Sport
- Sport: Ice hockey

Debora Montanari (born 17 October 1980) is a retired Italian ice hockey goaltender. She competed in the women's tournament at the 2006 Winter Olympics.

== Career statistics ==
=== International ===
Year	Team	Event	Result	GP	W	L	T/OT	MIN	GA	SO	GAA	SV%
2006	Italy	OG	8th	5	0	5	0	220:00	31	0	8.45	0.820
