= Patricia Elsmore-Sautter =

Swiss ice hockey player (born 1979)

- Born: 28 February 1979 (age 46) Schaffhausen, Switzerland
- Height: 165 cm (5 ft 5 in)
- Weight: 65 kg (143 lb; 10 st 3 lb)
- Position: Goaltender
- Caught: Left
- Played for: ZSC Lions
- National team: Switzerland
- Playing career: 1990–2009

Patricia Elsmore-Sautter (born 28 February 1979) is a retired Swiss ice hockey player. She played for the Swiss national women's ice hockey team and competed in the women's tournament at the 2006 Winter Olympics.

== Career statistics ==
Year	Team	Event	Result	GP	W	L	T/OT	MIN	GA	SO	GAA	SV%
1994	Switzerland	WC	7th	3	-	-	-	180:00	10	-	3.33	0.928
2006	Switzerland	OG	7th	3	0	3	0	150:00	12	0	4.81	0.884
