= Tina Schumacher =

Swiss ice hockey player

- Born: 20 March 1978 (age 47); Bern, Switzerland
- Height: 5 ft 3 in (160 cm)
- Weight: 126 lb (57 kg; 9 st 0 lb)
- Position: Forward
- Shot: Left
- Played for: EV Zug Damen
- National team: Switzerland
- Playing career: 1992–2014

Tina Schumacher (born 20 March 1978) is a Swiss former ice hockey player. She competed in the women's tournament at the 2006 Winter Olympics.
