= Michaela Lanzl =

German ice hockey player

- Born: 21 February 1983 (age 43) Starnberg, West Germany
- Height: 157 cm (5 ft 2 in)
- Weight: 51 kg (112 lb; 8 st 0 lb)
- Position: Forward
- Shot: Left
- Played for: ESC Planegg; Minnesota Duluth Bulldogs; DSC Oberthurgau; HC Lugano Ladies
- National team: Germany
- Playing career: 1998–2010

Michaela Lanzl (born 21 February 1983) is a German retired ice hockey forward. She represented Germany at the Olympic women's ice hockey tournaments in 2002 and 2006 and at six IIHF Women's World Championships.

== Playing career ==
Lanzl debuted with the German women’s national ice hockey team at the 1999 IIHF Women's World Championship. At 16 years old, she was the youngest player on the team but her skill was undeniable – she led the team in scoring with three goals and one assist in five games played.

Her national team career spanned eleven seasons, concluding after the 2009 IIHF Women's World Championship Division 1 tournament. She played a total of 144 international matches and scored 63 goals and 37 assists, making her a German record national team player (player recognized by the German Ice Hockey Federation for playing 100 or more games with the national team).

=== NCAA ===
Lanzl played with the Minnesota Duluth Bulldogs women's ice hockey program under head coach Shannon Miller during the 2005–06 and 2006–07 seasons. In her first season, she ranked third on the team for scoring and was named to the Western Collegiate Hockey Association (WCHA) All-Conference Third Team and All-Rookie Team.

== Personal life ==
Lanzl's younger sister, Andrea Lanzl, holds the record for most games played with the German national ice hockey team.

== Career stats ==
=== Olympics ===
Event	Games played	Goals	Assists	Points	PIM
2002 Olympics	5	3	1	4	6
2006 Olympics	5	1	3	4	2

== Awards and honors ==
- 2005–06 All-WCHA Third Team
- 2005–06 WCHA All-Rookie Team
- 2010 Elite Women's Hockey League (EWHL) Champion with ESC Planegg

== See also ==
- Germany women's national ice hockey team
