= Jennifer Harß =

German ice hockey goaltender and coach

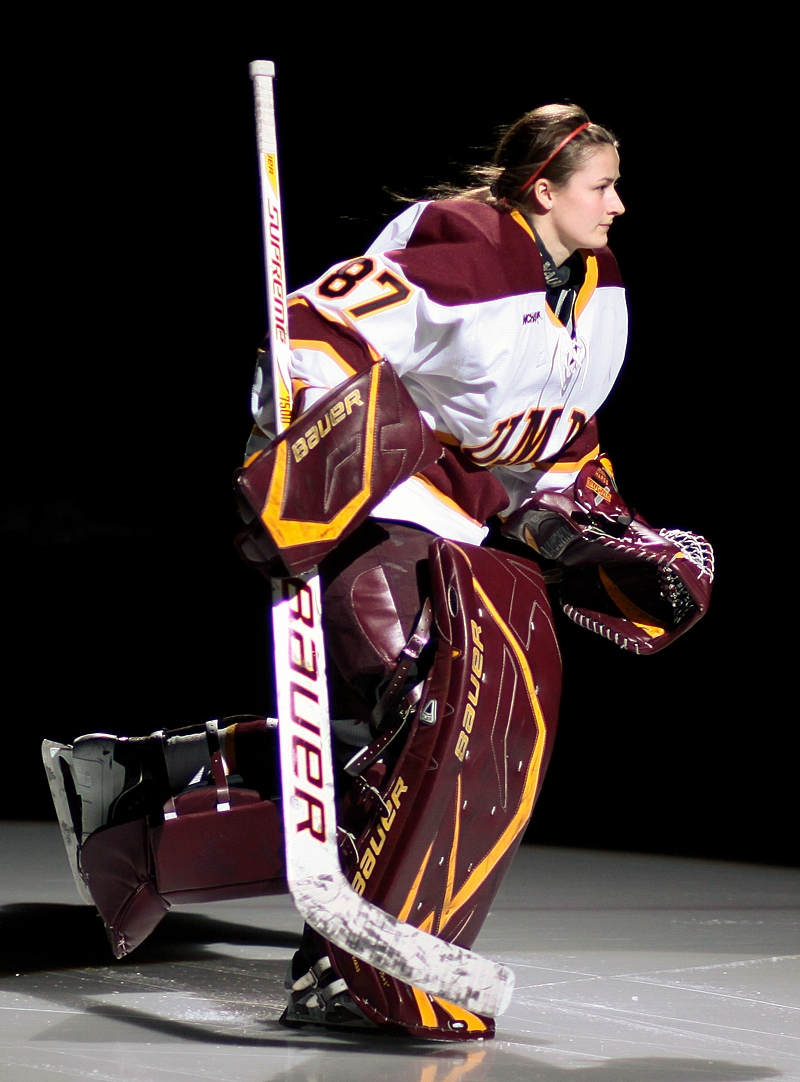
- Harß with the Minnesota Duluth Bulldogs in 2011
- Born: 14 July 1987 (age 38) Füssen, West Germany
- Height: 1.75 m (5 ft 9 in)
- Weight: 62 kg (137 lb; 9 st 11 lb)
- Position: Goaltender
- Caught: Left
- Played for: ESC Kempten; ECDC Memmingen; ECDC Memmingen; ESV Königsbrunn; ERC Sonthofen 1999; Minnesota Duluth Bulldogs; EV Pfronten; EV Füssen
- Current coach: Germany U16
- National team: Germany
- Playing career: 2005–2022
- Coaching career: 2022–present

Jennifer Sandra "Jenny" Harß (also anglicised Harss; born 14 July 1987) is a German ice hockey coach and retired goaltender for the German national ice hockey team. A two-time Olympian, she represented Germany at the Winter Olympic Games in 2006 and 2014. During her club career, she tended goal in the German Women's Ice Hockey Bundesliga (DFEL), the men's Oberliga, the men's Bayernliga, and with the Minnesota Duluth Bulldogs women's ice hockey program in the NCAA Division I.

Harß has coached the German women's national under-16 team since 2022.

== Playing career ==
Harß began playing ice hockey at age four in the minor ice hockey department of EV Füssen in her hometown of Füssen, Bavaria. Her national league career began in the 2004–05 season of the German national under-18 and under-20 men's leagues with the junior ice hockey teams of EV Füssen. She made her senior league debut in the following season, at age sixteen, playing in one men's Oberliga game with EV Füssen.

=== NCAA ===
During the 2009–10 season, Harß filled in for starting goalie Kim Martin. She made a team record of 1,138 saves and led all goalies in the NCAA. In 39 starts, Harß won 29 contests, the second most wins in one season in Bulldogs history. In addition, she played more minutes than any other goaltender in the NCAA. Harß accumulated 2386:51 minutes between the pipes while breaking the Bulldogs single-season record for saves, making 1062 in 37 outings. In the championship game of the 2010 Frozen Four tournament, Harß set a team record and NCAA postseason record for most saves in a game, with 49.

Harß served as one of two alternate captains during the 2011–12 Minnesota Duluth Bulldogs women's ice hockey season.

==== Milestones ====
- First Game: 2 October 2009 (vs. Robert Morris)
- First Start: 2 October 2009 (vs. Robert Morris)
- First Win: 2 October 2009 (vs. Robert Morris)
- First Assist: 27 February 2010 (vs. North Dakota)
- Most Saves in a Game: 49 (vs. Cornell, 21 March 2010)
- First Shutout : 11 October 2009 (vs. St. Cloud State)
- Led NCAA goalies in saves (2009–10)
- Led NCAA goalies in minutes played (2009–10)

== International play ==
Harß played with the German women's national ice hockey team from 2005 to 2021, during which she participated in nine IIHF World Championship tournaments, three Olympic qualification tournaments, and two Winter Olympic Games.

In the women's ice hockey tournament at the 2006 Winter Olympics in Turin, she ranked second of all goaltenders playing at least 40 percent of their team's minutes in both save percentage (SV%) and goals against average (GAA) after allowing just six goals on 103 shots; she concluded the tournament with an excellent .942 SV% and 1.89 GAA across three games played.

At the 2008 IIHF World Championship, she had more than half of the playing time in net for Germany.

== Career statistics ==
=== International ===
Year	Team	Event	Result	GP	W	L	T/OT	MIN	GA	SO	GAA	SV%
2006	Germany	OG	5th	3	2	1	0	190:00	6	1	1.89	0.942
2014	Germany	OG	6th	2	0	2	0	119:00	6	0	3.03	0.893

== Awards and honors ==
Award	Year
International
World Championship Top-3 Player on Team	2012, 2013, 2015, 2017, 2019
Germany
Bayernliga Champion	2013–14
College
WCHA Defensive Player of the Week	Week of 9 December 2009 (Note: Co-winner with Noora Räty of the Minnesota Golden Gophers)
All-WCHA Third Team	2009–10
WCHA All-Tourney Team	2010
NCAA Tournament Champion	2009–10
All-WCHA Academic Team	2010–11, 2011–12
UMD Women's Hockey 25th Anniversary Team	2024

== Personal life ==
Harß is a 2006 graduate of the Staatlicher Fach- und Berufsoberschule (FOS/BOS) in Kaufbeuren.

She was roommates with Canadian national team players Haley Irwin and Jocelyne Larocque during her time at the University of Minnesota Duluth.
