= Helen Resor (ice hockey) =

American ice hockey player

- Born: October 18, 1985 (age 41) Greenwich, Connecticut, USA
- Height: 5 ft 10 in (178 cm)
- Weight: 154 lb (70 kg; 11 st 0 lb)
- Position: Defence
- Shot: Left
- Played for: Yale Bulldogs
- National team: United States
- Playing career: 2005–2009
Medal record
Representing United States
Women's ice hockey
Olympic Games
Bronze medal – third place	2006 Turin	Tournament
IIHF World Women's Championships
Gold medal – first place	2005 Sweden	Tournament
Gold medal – first place	2009 Finland	Tournament
Silver medal – second place	2007 Canada	Tournament

Helen Resor (born October 18, 1985) is an American ice hockey player. She won a bronze medal at the 2006 Winter Olympics. She graduated from Yale University in 2009. Helen Resor was the first Yale hockey player to compete in women's ice hockey at the Olympics. Her sister, Jane, also played ice hockey for the Yale Bulldogs women's ice hockey program. Resor's brother-in-law is former NHL player Jeff Hamilton.

== Playing career ==
As a youth player she began a bench-clearing brawl in a game in which she was the only female playing. Resor played her high school hockey at Noble & Greenough Prep School in Massachusetts where she was coached by her uncle, Tom Resor.

Helen Resor was selected to play for Team USA in the 2006 Olympics. Resor was the first Bulldog to achieve that status, and when she won a bronze medal she became the first Yale hockey player of either gender to earn a medal since five Bulldog men won silver with Team USA in 1932.

== Awards and honors ==
- 2004-05 All USCHO.com Rookie Team
- 2009 Third Team All-ECAC
- Finalist for the 2009 Patty Kazmaier Award
