= Nina Ritter =

German ice hockey player

Personal information
- Nationality: German
- Born: 26 January 1981 (age 45) Hamburg, Germany

Sport
- Sport: Ice hockey

Nina Ritter (born 26 January 1981) is a German ice hockey player. She competed in the women's tournaments at the 2002 Winter Olympics and the 2006 Winter Olympics.
