= Christina Fellner =

German ice hockey player

- Born: 26 July 1973 (age 53) Garmisch-Partenkirchen, West Germany
- Height: 172 cm (5 ft 8 in)
- Weight: 75 kg (165 lb; 11 st 11 lb)
- Position: Defence
- Shot: Left
- Played for: SC Riessersee; TuS Geretsried
- National team: Germany and West Germany
- Playing career: 1987–2016
Medal record
Women's ice hockey
Representing West Germany
European Championship
Bronze medal – third place	1989 West Germany

Christina Fellner, née Oswald, (born 26 July 1973) is a German retired ice hockey player and record holder for most games played with the German women's national ice hockey team.

With the West German national team, she won a bronze medal at the 1989 IIHF European Women Championship and participated in the inaugural IIHF Women's World Championship in 1990. Fellner went on to represent Germany at seven World Championships, in 1999, 2000, 2001, 2004, 2005, 2007, and 2009; four European Championships, in 1991, 1993, 1995, and 1996; and in the women's ice hockey tournaments at the 2002 Winter Olympics in Salt Lake City and the 2006 Winter Olympics in Turin.

In 2008, Fellner was inducted into the German Ice Hockey Hall of Fame.
