= Torino Esposizioni =

Exhibition hall in Turin, Italy

Coordinates: 45°02′55″N 7°40′56″E

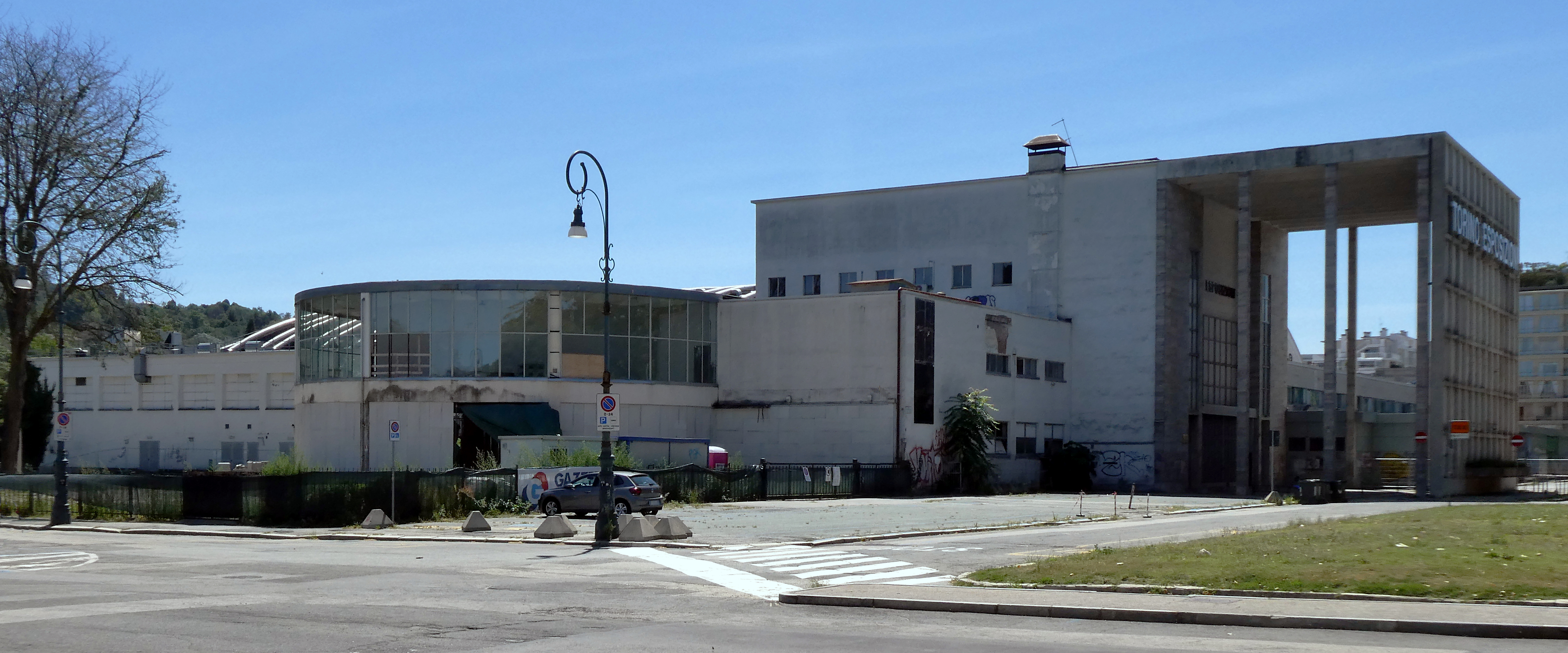
Torino Esposizioni in August 2023

Torino Esposizioni is an exhibition hall and convention centre in Turin, Italy which was primarily completed in 1948, designed by Pier Luigi Nervi.

The building is made with primarily ferrocemento and glass. Ferrocemento is a form of concrete construction made with thin cross-sections of concrete and metal wires (reinforcement) with re-usable forms, which Nervi pioneered in Italy and elsewhere.

== 2006 Winter Olympics ==
The Torino Esposizioni was converted into a temporary ice rink to host a number of ice hockey events at the 2006 Winter Olympics along with Palasport Olimpico. The temporary arena had the capacity of 4,320 people.

The boards in the hockey rink are stiffer than in a permanent facility, while the glass has more give. The facility was converted into an ice rink by laying a sand base and refrigeration pipes into the base, and then freezing water ice atop the substrate. This is similar to the temporary outdoor rink the NHL used for its Heritage Classic game in Edmonton.

After the Olympics were complete, the arena returned to hosting fairs and exhibitions.

== In film ==
The building appears in a deleted scene from the 1969 film The Italian Job. A portion of the car chase was filmed as a dance between the Minis and police cars with a full orchestra playing "The Blue Danube" as accompaniment. The scene appears as an extra on home video releases.
