= Alexandra Kapustina =

Russian ice hockey defender (born 1984)

Alexandra Vitaliyevna Kapustina Александра Витальевна Капустина
- Born: April 7, 1984 (age 42) Pervouralsk, Russian SFSR, Soviet Union
- Height: 5 ft 6 in (168 cm)
- Weight: 161 lb (73 kg; 11 st 7 lb)
- Position: Defence
- Shoots: Left
- WHL team Former teams: HC Agidel Ufa; SKIF Nizhny Novgorod
- National team: Russia
- Playing career: 2004–present
Medal record
World Championship
Bronze medal – third place	2013 Canada
Bronze medal – third place	2016 Canada

Alexandra Vitaliyevna Kapustina (Russian: Александра Витальевна Капустина) (born 7 April 1984) is a Russian ice hockey defender.

== International career ==
Kapustina was selected for the Russia national women's ice hockey team in the 2006 and 2010 Winter Olympics and 2014 In 2010, she led her team in ice time, and recorded two assists. In 2006, she scored one goal in the five games.

Kapustina has also appeared for Russia at eight IIHF Women's World Championships. Her first appearance came in 2004. She was a member of the teams that won a bronze medal at the 2013 and 2016 IIHF Women's World Championships.

== Career statistics ==
=== International career ===
Year	Team	Event	GP	G	A	Pts	PIM
2004	Russia	WW	4	0	0	0	6
2006	Russia	Oly	5	1	0	1	8
2007	Russia	WW	4	0	0	0	6
2008	Russia	WW	4	1	0	1	4
2009	Russia	WW	4	1	0	1	2
2010	Russia	Oly	5	0	2	2	2
2011	Russia	WW	6	1	2	3	4
2012	Russia	WW	5	0	0	0	6
2013	Russia	WW	6	0	3	3	0
