= Ice hockey at the 2002 Winter Olympics – Women's team rosters =

The ice hockey team rosters at the 2002 Winter Olympics for the women's tournament consisted of the following players:

== Canada ==
Dana Antal, Kelly Bechard, Jennifer Botterill, Thérèse Brisson, Cassie Campbell, Isabelle Chartrand, Lori Dupuis, Danielle Goyette, Geraldine Heaney, Jayna Hefford, Becky Kellar, Caroline Ouellette, Cherie Piper, Cheryl Pounder, Tammy Lee Shewchuk, Sami Jo Small, Colleen Sostorics, Kim St-Pierre, Vicky Sunohara, Hayley Wickenheiser

== China ==
Chen Jing, Dai Qiuwa, Guan Weinan, Guo Hong, Hu Chunrong, Jin Fengling, Li Xuan, Liu Hongmei, Liu Yanhui, Lu Yan, Ma Xiaojun, Sang Hong, Shen Tiantian, Sun Rui, Wang Linuo, Wang Ying, Xu Lei, Yang Xiuqing, Zhang Jing

== Finland ==
- Head Coach: (Finland) Jouko Lukkarila

Pos.	No.	Name	2001-02 team
G	19	Tuula Puputti	(United States) University of Minnesota Duluth
G	30	Minna-Monica Halonen	(Finland) Tampereen Tappara
D	3	Emma Laaksonen	(United States) Ohio State University
D	5	Pirjo Ahonen	(Finland) Jyväskylän Hockey Cats
D	6	Saija Sirviö	(Finland) Oulun Kärpät
D	9	Terhi Mertanen	(Finland) Espoo Blues
D	20	Kirsi Hänninen	(Finland) Oulun Kärpät
D	22	Päivi Salo	(Finland) Oulun Kärpät
F	8	Marjo Voutilainen	(Finland) Itä-Helsingin Kiekko
F	10	Sari Fisk	(Finland) Tampereen Ilves
F	11	Oona Parviainen	(Finland) Espoo Blues
F	13	Riikka Nieminen	(Finland) Jyväskylän Hockey Cats
F	15	Satu Hoikkala	(Finland) Oulun Kärpät
F	16	Tiia Reima	(Finland) Itä-Helsingin Kiekko
F	21	Petra Vaarakallio	(Finland) Espoo Blues
F	23	Hanne Sikiö	(United States) University of Minnesota Duluth
F	25	Marja-Helena Pälvilä	(Finland) Espoo Blues
F	26	Henna Savikuja	(Finland) Oulun Kärpät
F	28	Katja Riipi	(Finland) Itä-Helsingin Kiekko
F	29	Karoliina Rantamäki	(Finland) Espoo Blues

== Germany ==
Maritta Becker, Tina Evers, Steffi Frühwirt, Claudia Grundmann, Sandra Kinza, Sabrina Kruck, Michaela Lanzl, Nina Linde, Christina Oswald, Franziska Reindl, Nina Ritter, Sabine Rückauer, Anja Scheytt, Jana Schreckenbach, Esther Thyssen, Maren Valenti, Stephanie Wartosch-Kürten, Julia Wierscher, Raffi Wolf, Nina Ziegenhals

== Kazakhstan ==
Viktoriya Adyeva, Lyubov Alekseyeva, Antonida Asonova, Dinara Dikambayeva, Tatyana Khlyzova, Olga Konysheva, Olga Kryukova, Nadezhda Loseva, Svetlana Maltseva, Yekaterina Maltseva, Olga Potapova, Viktoriya Sazonova, Yelena Shtelmayster, Yuliya Solovyova, Oksana Taykevich, Nataliya Trunova, Lyubov Vafina, Svetlana Vasina, Nataliya Yakovchuk

== Russia ==
The following is the Russia women's national ice hockey team roster for the women's ice hockey tournament at the 2002 Winter Olympics.

Head coach: (Russia) Viacheslav Dolgushin Assistant coach: (Russia) Andrey Anisimov, (Russia) Igor Prusov

No.	Pos.	Name	Height	Weight	Birthdate	Birthplace	2001–02 team
2	D	Maria Barykina – A	1.70 m (5 ft 7 in)	60 kg (130 lb)	9 December 1973	Moscow, Soviet Union	(Russia) SKIF Moscow
3	D	Kristina Petrovskaya	1.68 m (5 ft 6 in)	67 kg (148 lb)	3 June 1980	Moscow, Soviet Union	(United States) Minnesota Duluth Bulldogs
4	D	Alena Khomich	1.66 m (5 ft 5 in)	58 kg (128 lb)	26 February 1981	Pervouralsk, Soviet Union	(Russia) Spartak Yekaterinburg
7	D	Elena Bobrova	1.70 m (5 ft 7 in)	63 kg (139 lb)	23 August 1974	Krasnoyarsk, Soviet Union	(Russia) SKIF Moscow
10	F	Larisa Mishina	1.68 m (5 ft 6 in)	71 kg (157 lb)	10 September 1975	Moscow, Soviet Union	(Russia) SKIF Moscow
11	F	Tatiana Sotnikova	1.66 m (5 ft 5 in)	61 kg (134 lb)	20 January 1981	Moscow, Soviet Union	(Russia) SKIF Moscow
12	F	Yulia Gladysheva	1.66 m (5 ft 5 in)	56 kg (123 lb)	4 December 1981	Moscow, Soviet Union	(Russia) SKIF Moscow
15	D	Olga Permyakova	1.68 m (5 ft 6 in)	64 kg (141 lb)	12 April 1982	Chelyabinsk, Soviet Union	(Russia) Spartak Chelyabinsk
17	F	Ekaterina Smolentseva	1.70 m (5 ft 7 in)	66 kg (146 lb)	15 September 1981	Pervouralsk, Soviet Union	(Russia) Spartak Yekaterinburg
18	F	Tatyana Tsaryova	1.64 m (5 ft 5 in)	56 kg (123 lb)	30 December 1977		(Russia) SKIF Moscow
20	G	Irina Gashennikova	1.59 m (5 ft 3 in)	61 kg (134 lb)	11 May 1975	Pushkino, Soviet Union	(Russia) SKIF Moscow
21	F	Svetlana Trefilova	1.64 m (5 ft 5 in)	66 kg (146 lb)	20 May 1973	Sverdlovsk, Soviet Union	(Russia) SKIF Moscow
22	F	Svetlana Terentieva	1.65 m (5 ft 5 in)	61 kg (134 lb)	25 September 1983	Pervouralsk, Soviet Union	(Russia) Spartak Yekaterinburg
23	F	Tatiana Burina	1.64 m (5 ft 5 in)	62 kg (137 lb)	20 March 1980	Novosibirsk, Soviet Union	(Russia) SKIF Moscow
25	F	Ekaterina Pashkevich – A	1.80 m (5 ft 11 in)	73 kg (161 lb)	19 September 1972	Moscow, Soviet Union	(United States) Boston College Eagles
26	D	Olga Savenkova	1.79 m (5 ft 10 in)	61 kg (134 lb)	2 July 1982	Krasnoyarsk, Soviet Union	(Russia) Lokomotiv Krasnoyarsk
27	F	Elena Byalkovskaya	1.79 m (5 ft 10 in)	76 kg (168 lb)	22 March 1977	Moscow, Soviet Union	(Russia) SKIF Moscow
28	F	Oxana Tretiyakova	1.64 m (5 ft 5 in)	76 kg (168 lb)	10 March 1979	Krasnoyarsk, Soviet Union	(Russia) SKIF Moscow
29	D	Zhanna Shchelchkova – C	1.64 m (5 ft 5 in)	75 kg (165 lb)	10 February 1969	Moscow, Soviet Union	(Russia) SKIF Moscow
30	G	Irina Votintseva	1.64 m (5 ft 5 in)	64 kg (141 lb)	19 September 1970		(Russia) Spartak Yekaterinburg

== Sweden ==
Annica Åhlén, Lotta Almblad, Anna Andersson, Gunilla Andersson, Emelie Berggren, Kristina Bergstrand, Ann-Louise Edstrand, Joa Elfsberg, Erika Holst, Nanna Jansson, Maria Larsson, Ylva Lindberg, Ulrica Lindström, Kim Martin Hasson, Josefin Pettersson, Maria Rooth, Danijela Rundqvist, Evelina Samuelsson, Therese Sjölander, Anna Vikman

== United States ==
The following is the United States roster for the women's ice hockey tournament at the 2002 Winter Olympics.

Head coach: (United States) Ben Smith
Assistant coach: (United States) Julie Sasner

No.	Pos.	Name	Height	Weight	Birthdate	Birthplace	2001–02 team
1	G	Sara DeCosta	5 ft 10 in (1.78 m)	145 lb (66 kg)	13 May 1977 (aged 24)	Warwick, Rhode Island	(United States) U.S. National Team
2	D	Tara Mounsey	5 ft 6 in (1.68 m)	150 lb (68 kg)	12 March 1978 (aged 23)	Concord, New Hampshire	(United States) Brown University
3	D	Courtney Kennedy	5 ft 9 in (1.75 m)	190 lb (86 kg)	29 March 1979 (aged 22)	Woburn, Massachusetts	(United States) University of Minnesota
4	D	Angela Ruggiero	5 ft 9 in (1.75 m)	190 lb (86 kg)	3 January 1980 (aged 22)	Panorama City, California	(United States) U.S. National Team
5	D	Lyndsay Wall	5 ft 8 in (1.73 m)	142 lb (64 kg)	12 May 1985 (aged 16)	Churchville, New York	(United States) Syracuse Stars
6	F	Karyn Bye – A	5 ft 8 in (1.73 m)	165 lb (75 kg)	18 May 1971 (aged 30)	River Falls, Wisconsin	(United States) U.S. National Team
7	D	Sue Merz	5 ft 5 in (1.65 m)	145 lb (66 kg)	10 April 1972 (aged 29)	Greenwich, Connecticut	(United States) U.S. National Team
8	F	Laurie Baker	5 ft 7 in (1.70 m)	135 lb (61 kg)	6 November 1976 (aged 25)	Concord, Massachusetts	(United States) U.S. National Team
9	F	Andrea Kilbourne	5 ft 6 in (1.68 m)	175 lb (79 kg)	19 April 1980 (aged 21)	Saranac Lake, New York	(United States) Princeton University
11	F	A. J. Mleczko	5 ft 11 in (1.80 m)	160 lb (73 kg)	14 June 1975 (aged 26)	Nantucket, Massachusetts	(United States) U.S. National Team
12	F	Jenny Schmidgall-Potter	5 ft 4 in (1.63 m)	145 lb (66 kg)	12 January 1979 (aged 23)	Saint Paul, Minnesota	(United States) University of Minnesota Duluth
13	F	Julie Chu	5 ft 8 in (1.73 m)	155 lb (70 kg)	13 March 1982 (aged 19)	Fairfield, Connecticut	(United States) U.S. National Team
15	F	Shelley Looney	5 ft 5 in (1.65 m)	140 lb (64 kg)	21 January 1972 (aged 30)	Trenton, Michigan	(United States) U.S. National Team
17	F	Krissy Wendell	5 ft 6 in (1.68 m)	155 lb (70 kg)	12 September 1981 (aged 20)	Brooklyn Park, Minnesota	(United States) U.S. National Team
20	F	Katie King	5 ft 9 in (1.75 m)	170 lb (77 kg)	24 May 1975 (aged 26)	Salem, New Hampshire	(United States) U.S. National Team
21	F	Cammi Granato – C	5 ft 7 in (1.70 m)	140 lb (64 kg)	25 March 1971 (aged 30)	Downers Grove, Illinois	(United States) U.S. National Team
22	F	Natalie Darwitz	5 ft 2 in (1.57 m)	130 lb (59 kg)	13 October 1983 (aged 18)	Eagan, Minnesota	(United States) Eagan High School
24	D	Chris Bailey	5 ft 6 in (1.68 m)	160 lb (73 kg)	5 February 1972 (aged 30)	Marietta, New York	(United States) U.S. National Team
25	F	Tricia Dunn	5 ft 8 in (1.73 m)	150 lb (68 kg)	25 April 1974 (aged 27)	Derry, New Hampshire	(United States) U.S. National Team
29	G	Sarah Tueting	5 ft 7 in (1.70 m)	140 lb (64 kg)	26 April 1976 (aged 25)	Winnetka, Illinois	(United States) U.S. National Team
