= Germany at the 2002 Winter Olympics =

- IOC code: GER
- NOC: German Olympic Sports Confederation
- Website: www.dosb.de (in German, English, and French)

in Salt Lake City
- Competitors: 157 (88 men, 69 women) in 14 sports
- Flag bearer: Hilde Gerg (alpine skiing)
- Medals Ranked 2nd: Gold 12 Silver 16 Bronze 8 Total 36

Winter Olympics appearances (overview)
- 1928; 1932; 1936; 1948; 1952; 1956–1988; 1992; 1994; 1998; 2002; 2006; 2010; 2014; 2018; 2022; 2026

Other related appearances
- United Team of Germany (1956–1964); East Germany (1968–1988); West Germany (1968–1988)

Germany competed at the 2002 Winter Olympics in Salt Lake City, United States. In terms of gold medals, Germany finished ranking second with 12 gold medals. Meanwhile, the 36 total medals won by German athletes were the most of any nation at these Games, as well at any Winter Olympics, until this record was broken by the United States at the 2010 Winter Olympics.

== Medalists ==
Medal	Name	Sport	Event	Date
Gold	Claudia Pechstein	Speed skating	Women's 3000 metres	10 February
Gold	Andrea Henkel	Biathlon	Women's individual	11 February
Gold	Kati Wilhelm	Biathlon	Women's sprint	13 February
Gold	Sylke Otto	Luge	Women's singles	13 February
Gold	Alexander Resch; Patric-Fritz Leitner	Luge	Doubles	15 February
Gold	Christoph Langen; Markus Zimmermann	Bobsleigh	Two-man	17 February
Gold	Michael Uhrmann; Stephan Hocke; Sven Hannawald; Martin Schmitt	Ski jumping	Large hill team	18 February
Gold	Katrin Apel; Uschi Disl; Andrea Henkel; Kati Wilhelm	Biathlon	Women's relay	18 February
Gold	Anni Friesinger	Speed skating	Women's 1500 metres	20 February
Gold	Manuela Henkel; Viola Bauer; Claudia Kuenzel; Evi Sachenbacher	Cross-country skiing	Women's 4 × 5 kilometre relay	21 February
Gold	Claudia Pechstein	Speed skating	Women's 5000 metres	23 February
Gold	André Lange; Enrico Kuehn; Kevin Kuske; Carsten Embach	Bobsleigh	Four-man	23 February
Silver	Sven Hannawald	Ski jumping	Normal hill individual	10 February
Silver	Georg Hackl	Luge	Men's singles	11 February
Silver	Frank Luck	Biathlon	Men's individual	11 February
Silver	Sven Fischer	Biathlon	Men's sprint	13 February
Silver	Uschi Disl	Biathlon	Women's sprint	13 February
Silver	Barbara Niedernhuber	Luge	Women's singles	13 February
Silver	Monique Garbrecht-Enfeldt	Speed skating	Women's 500 metres	14 February
Silver	Kati Wilhelm	Biathlon	Women's pursuit	16 February
Silver	Björn Kircheisen; Georg Hettich; Marcel Hoehlig; Ronny Ackermann	Nordic combined	Team	17 February
Silver	Sabine Völker	Speed skating	Women's 1000 metres	17 February
Silver	Evi Sachenbacher	Cross-country skiing	Women's sprint	19 February
Silver	Peter Schlickenrieder	Cross-country skiing	Men's sprint	19 February
Silver	Sandra Prokoff; Ulrike Holzner	Bobsleigh	Two-woman	19 February
Silver	Sven Fischer; Frank Luck; Ricco Groß; Peter Sendel	Biathlon	Men's relay	20 February
Silver	Sabine Völker	Speed skating	Women's 1500 metres	20 February
Silver	Ronny Ackermann	Nordic combined	Sprint	22 February
Bronze	Jens Boden	Speed skating	Men's 5000 metres	9 February
Bronze	Silke Kraushaar	Luge	Women's singles	13 February
Bronze	Martina Ertl	Alpine skiing	Women's combined	14 February
Bronze	Sabine Völker	Speed skating	Women's 500 metres	14 February
Bronze	Viola Bauer	Cross-country skiing	Women's 2 × 5 kilometre pursuit	15 February
Bronze	Ricco Groß	Biathlon	Men's pursuit	16 February
Bronze	Tobias Angerer; Jens Filbrich; Andreas Schluetter; René Sommerfeldt	Cross-country skiing	Men's 4 × 10 kilometre relay	17 February
Bronze	Susi Erdmann; Nicole Herschmann	Bobsleigh	Two-woman	19 February

== Alpine skiing ==
Men

Athlete	Event	Race 1	Race 2	Total	
Athlete	Event	Time	Time	Time	Rank
Max Rauffer	Downhill			1:42.52	34
Max Rauffer	Super-G			1:24.54	22
Markus Eberle	Slalom	DNF	–	DNF	–

Women

Athlete	Event	Race 1	Race 2	Total	
Athlete	Event	Time	Time	Time	Rank
Petra Haltmayr	Downhill			DNF	–
Sibylle Brauner	Downhill			1:42.97	26
Regina Häusl	Downhill			1:40.84	10
Hilde Gerg	Downhill			1:40.49	4
Regina Häusl	Super-G			DNF	–
Petra Haltmayr	Super-G			1:16.25	23
Martina Ertl-Renz	Super-G			1:14.84	11
Hilde Gerg	Super-G			1:13.99	5
Martina Ertl-Renz	Giant Slalom	DNF	–	DNF	–
Monika Bergmann-Schmuderer	Giant Slalom	1:19.89	DNF	DNF	–
Petra Haltmayr	Giant Slalom	1:19.36	DNF	DNF	–
Annemarie Gerg	Giant Slalom	1:18.79	1:17.39	2:36.18	22
Annemarie Gerg	Slalom	DNF	–	DNF	–
Monika Bergmann-Schmuderer	Slalom	54.18	53.80	1:47.98	6
Martina Ertl-Renz	Slalom	54.08	53.74	1:47.82	5

Women's combined

Athlete	Downhill	Slalom		Total	
Athlete	Time	Time 1	Time 2	Total time	Rank
Hilde Gerg	DNF	47.70	45.57	DNF	–
Petra Haltmayr	DNF	47.05	45.27	DNF	–
Martina Ertl-Renz	1:16.78	45.10	43.28	2:45.16	3rd place, bronze medalist(s)

== Biathlon ==
Men

Event	Athlete	Misses ^{1}	Time	Rank
10 km sprint	Frank Luck	2	26:47.7	29
10 km sprint	Michael Greis	2	26:18.4	15
10 km sprint	Ricco Groß	1	25:44.6	4
10 km sprint	Sven Fischer	1	25:20.2	2nd place, silver medalist(s)
12.5 km pursuit ^{2}	Michael Greis	3	34:19.9	16
12.5 km pursuit ^{2}	Sven Fischer	4	34:09.5	12
12.5 km pursuit ^{2}	Frank Luck	1	34:01.0	11
12.5 km pursuit ^{2}	Ricco Groß	2	33:30.6	3rd place, bronze medalist(s)

Event	Athlete	Time	Misses	Adjusted time ^{3}	Rank
20 km	Alexander Wolf	51:16.6	5	56:16.6	34
20 km	Sven Fischer	51:23.2	4	55:23.2	29
20 km	Ricco Groß	49:58.7	2	51:58.7	4
20 km	Frank Luck	51:39.4	0	51:39.4	2nd place, silver medalist(s)

Men's 4 × 7.5 km relay

Athletes	Race		
Athletes	Misses ^{1}	Time	Rank
Ricco Groß; Peter Sendel; Sven Fischer; Frank Luck	1	1'24:27.6	2nd place, silver medalist(s)

Women

Event	Athlete	Misses ^{1}	Time	Rank
7.5 km sprint	Andrea Henkel	2	22:41.1	25
7.5 km sprint	Katrin Apel	3	22:01.7	12
7.5 km sprint	Uschi Disl	1	20:57.0	2nd place, silver medalist(s)
7.5 km sprint	Kati Wilhelm	0	20:41.4	1st place, gold medalist(s)
10 km pursuit ^{4}	Andrea Henkel	1	32:35.4	13
10 km pursuit ^{4}	Uschi Disl	7	32:21.2	9
10 km pursuit ^{4}	Katrin Apel	3	31:47.9	7
10 km pursuit ^{4}	Kati Wilhelm	4	31:13.0	2nd place, silver medalist(s)

Event	Athlete	Time	Misses	Adjusted time ^{3}	Rank
15 km	Katrin Apel	45:16.7	5	50:16.7	18
15 km	Uschi Disl	45:43.4	4	49:43.4	12
15 km	Martina Glagow-Beck	47:34.2	1	48:34.2	7
15 km	Andrea Henkel	46:29.1	1	47:29.1	1st place, gold medalist(s)

Women's 4 × 7.5 km relay

Athletes	Race		
Athletes	Misses ^{1}	Time	Rank
Katrin Apel; Uschi Disl; Andrea Henkel; Kati Wilhelm	1	1'27:55.0	1st place, gold medalist(s)

^{1} A penalty loop of 150 metres had to be skied per missed target.
^{2} Starting delay based on 10 km sprint results.
^{3} One minute added per missed target.
^{4} Starting delay based on 7.5 km sprint results.

== Bobsleigh ==
Men

Sled	Athletes	Event	Run 1		Run 2		Run 3		Run 4		Total	
Sled	Athletes	Event	Time	Rank	Time	Rank	Time	Rank	Time	Rank	Time	Rank
GER-1	Christoph Langen; Markus Zimmermann	Two-man	47.54	2	47.52	1	47.44	1	47.61	1	3:10.11	1st place, gold medalist(s)
GER-2	Franz Sagmeister; René Spies	Two-man	47.77	6	47.69	4	47.61	3	47.77	7	3:10.84	6

Sled	Athletes	Event	Run 1		Run 2		Run 3		Run 4		Total	
Sled	Athletes	Event	Time	Rank	Time	Rank	Time	Rank	Time	Rank	Time	Rank
GER-1	Christoph Langen; Markus Zimmermann; Franz Sagmeister; Stefan Barucha	Four-man	46.91	7	46.77	4	DNF	–	–	–	DNF	–
GER-2	André Lange; Enrico Kühn; Kevin Kuske; Carsten Embach	Four-man	46.71	2	46.64	3	46.84	1	47.32	2	3:07.51	1st place, gold medalist(s)

Women

Sled	Athletes	Event	Run 1		Run 2		Total	
Sled	Athletes	Event	Time	Rank	Time	Rank	Time	Rank
GER-1	Sandra Prokoff-Kiriasis; Ulrike Holzner	Two-woman	49.10	2	48.96	2	1:38.06	2nd place, silver medalist(s)
GER-2	Susi Erdmann; Nicole Herschmann	Two-woman	49.19	3	49.10	4	1:38.29	3rd place, bronze medalist(s)

== Cross-country skiing ==
Men

Sprint

Athlete	Qualifying round		Quarter finals		Semi finals		Finals	
Athlete	Time	Rank	Time	Rank	Time	Rank	Time	Final rank
René Sommerfeldt	2:54.87	20	did not advance					
Tobias Angerer	2:52.31	10 Q	2:54.4	1 Q	3:00.4	4 QB	2:58.0	7
Peter Schlickenrieder	2:51.12	5 Q	2:55.0	1 Q	3:09.9	1 QF	2:57.0	2nd place, silver medalist(s)

Pursuit

Athlete	10 km C		10 km F pursuit^{1}	
Athlete	Time	Rank	Time	Final rank
Axel Teichmann	27:31.2	32 Q	25:53.4	38
Tobias Angerer	27:30.7	31 Q	24:50.9	23
Andreas Schlütter	26:52.5	12 Q	24:41.2	17
René Sommerfeldt	26:46.0	11 Q	24:15.7	10

Event	Athlete	Race	
Event	Athlete	Time	Rank
15 km C	Peter Schlickenrieder	42:34.0	55
15 km C	Jens Filbrich	39:57.0	33
15 km C	Andreas Schlütter	39:19.2	15
15 km C	Axel Teichmann	39:05.3	14
30 km F	Tobias Angerer	1'16:13.1	33
30 km F	Axel Teichmann	1'14:23.8	19
30 km F	René Sommerfeldt	1'13:55.8	16
50 km C	Jens Filbrich	2'15:44.8	21
50 km C	Andreas Schlütter	2'08:54.8	4

^{1} Starting delay based on 10 km C. results.
C = Classical style, F = Freestyle

4 × 10 km relay

Athletes	Race	
Athletes	Time	Rank
Jens Filbrich; Andreas Schlütter; Tobias Angerer; René Sommerfeldt	1'33:34.5	3rd place, bronze medalist(s)

Women

Sprint

Athlete	Qualifying round		Quarter finals		Semi finals		Finals	
Athlete	Time	Rank	Time	Rank	Time	Rank	Time	Final rank
Anke Reschwamm-Schulze	3:17.45	13 Q	3:15.9	3	did not advance			
Manuela Henkel	3:16.89	10 Q	3:16.3	4	did not advance			
Claudia Künzel-Nystad	3:16.41	9 Q	3:15.1	1 Q	3:24.5	2 QF	3:13.3	4
Evi Sachenbacher-Stehle	3:13.81	3 Q	3:40.2	1 Q	3:18.5	2 QF	3:12.2	2nd place, silver medalist(s)

Pursuit

Athlete	5 km C		5 km F pursuit^{2}	
Athlete	Time	Rank	Time	Final rank
Claudia Künzel-Nystad	14:37.0	55	did not advance	
Evi Sachenbacher-Stehle	14:05.4	29 Q	13:12.8	18
Manuela Henkel	13:49.8	16 Q	13:13.2	20
Viola Bauer	13:15.3	3 Q	12:12.9	3rd place, bronze medalist(s)

Event	Athlete	Race	
Event	Athlete	Time	Rank
10 km C	Manuela Henkel	30:00.5	18
10 km C	Viola Bauer	29:30.0	10
15 km F	Anke Reschwamm-Schulze	43:53.1	35
15 km F	Claudia Künzel-Nystad	21:10.2	26
15 km F	Evi Sachenbacher-Stehle	40:57.6	12
30 km C	Manuela Henkel	DNF	–
30 km C	Viola Bauer	1'33:25.1	6

^{2} Starting delay based on 5 km C. results.
C = Classical style, F = Freestyle

4 × 5 km relay

Athletes	Race	
Athletes	Time	Rank
Manuela Henkel; Viola Bauer; Claudia Künzel-Nystad; Evi Sachenbacher-Stehle	49:30.6	1st place, gold medalist(s)

== Curling ==
=== Men's tournament ===
==== Group stage ====
Top four teams advanced to semi-finals.

Country	Skip	W	L
Canada	Kevin Martin	8	1
Norway	Pål Trulsen	7	2
Switzerland	Andreas Schwaller	6	3
Sweden	Peja Lindholm	6	3
Finland	Markku Uusipaavalniemi	5	4
Germany 6th	Sebastian Stock	4	5
Denmark	Ulrik Schmidt	3	6
(United Kingdom) Great Britain	Hammy McMillan	3	6
United States	Tim Somerville	3	6
France	Dominique Dupont-Roc	0	9

Team 1	Score	Team 2
France	5–9	Germany
Finland	6–7	Germany
Germany	9–8	United States
United Kingdom	7–6	Germany
Denmark	6–7	Germany
Germany	7–9	Canada
Norway	10–5	Germany
Germany	4–5	Sweden
Germany	4–10	Switzerland

Contestants

Germany
EC Oberstdorf, Oberstdorf

Skip: Sebastian Stock
Third: Daniel Herberg
Second: Stephan Knoll
Lead: Markus Messenzehl
Alternate: Patrick Hoffman

=== Women's tournament ===
==== Group stage ====
Top four teams advanced to semi-finals.

Country	Skip	W	L
Canada	Kelley Law	8	1
Switzerland	Luzia Ebnöther	7	2
United States	Kari Erickson	6	3
(United Kingdom) Great Britain	Rhona Martin	5	4
Germany 5th	Natalie Neßler	5	4
Sweden	Elisabet Gustafson	5	4
Norway	Dordi Nordby	4	5
Japan	Akiko Katoh	2	7
Denmark	Lene Bidstrup	2	7
Russia	Olga Jarkova	1	8

Team 1	Score	Team 2
Russia	5–8	Germany
Denmark	5–9	Germany
Germany	5–3	Japan
Germany	5–10	Norway
Germany	4–8	Canada
Germany	7–5	Sweden
United States	7–6	Germany
United Kingdom	5–7	Germany
Germany	4–10	Switzerland

Tie-breaker

Team 1	Score	Team 2
United Kingdom	9-5	Germany 5th

Contestants

Germany
SC Riessersee, Garmisch-Partenkirchen

Skip: Natalie Neßler
Third: Sabine Belkofer
Second: Heike Wieländer
Lead: Andrea Stock
Alternate: Karin Fischer

== Figure skating ==
Pairs

Athletes	Points	SP	FS	Rank
Mariana Kautz; Norman Jeschke	21.0	12	15	14

Ice Dancing

Athletes	Points	CD1	CD2	OD	FD	Rank
Kati Winkler; René Lohse	16.0	8	8	8	8	8

== Ice hockey ==
=== Men's tournament ===
==== Preliminary round - group A ====
Top team (shaded) advanced to the first round.

Team	GP	W	L	T	GF	GA	GD	Pts
Germany	3	3	0	0	10	3	+7	6
Latvia	3	1	1	1	11	12	−1	3
Austria	3	1	2	0	7	9	−2	2
Slovakia	3	0	2	1	8	12	−4	1

All times are local (UTC-7).

9 February 2002; 16:00	Germany	3 – 0 (0–0, 0–2, 0–1)	Slovakia	E Center, West Valley City; Attendance: 8,504

10 February 2002; 16:00	Austria	2 – 3 (0–2, 2–0, 0–1)	Germany	Peaks Ice Arena, Provo; Attendance: 6,444

12 February 2002; 19:00	Germany	4 – 1 (2–1, 2–0, 0–0)	Latvia	Peaks Ice Arena, Provo; Attendance: 6,574

==== First round - group C ====
Team	GP	W	L	T	GF	GA	GD	Pts
Sweden	3	3	0	0	14	4	+10	6
Czech Republic	3	1	1	1	12	7	+5	3
Canada	3	1	1	1	8	10	−2	3
Germany	3	0	3	0	5	18	−13	0

All times are local (UTC-7).

15 February 2002; 19:00	Czech Republic	8 – 2 (3–0, 3–1, 2–1)	Germany	Peaks Ice Arena, Provo; Attendance: 6,303

17 February 2002; 19:00	Canada	3 – 2 (0–0, 3–0, 0–2)	Germany	Peaks Ice Arena, Provo; Attendance: 6,425

18 February 2002; 19:00	Germany	1 – 7 (0–3, 0–3, 1–1)	Sweden	Peaks Ice Arena, Provo; Attendance: 6,348

==== Quarter final ====
20 February 2002; 16:00	United States	5 – 0 (1–0, 4–0, 0–0)	Germany	E Center, West Valley City; Attendance: 8,599

- Team roster

- Marc Seliger
- Robert Müller
- Christian Künast
- Dennis Seidenberg
- Daniel Kunce
- Christoph Schubert
- Mirko Lüdemann
- Erich Goldmann
- Christian Ehrhoff
- Andreas Renz
- Jörg Mayr
- Len Soccio
- Klaus Kathan
- Mark MacKay
- Stefan Ustorf
- Tobias Abstreiter
- Andreas Morczinietz
- Jochen Hecht
- Andreas Loth
- Marco Sturm
- Jan Benda
- Martin Reichel
- Jürgen Rumrich
- Wayne Hynes
- Daniel Kreutzer

- Head coach: Hans Zach

=== Women's tournament ===
==== First round - group B ====
Top two teams (shaded) advanced to semifinals.

Team	GP	W	L	T	GF	GA	GD	Pts
United States	3	3	0	0	28	1	+27	6
Finland	3	2	1	0	7	6	+1	4
Germany	3	0	2	1	6	18	−12	1
China	3	0	2	1	6	21	−15	1

All times are local (UTC-7).

12 February 2002; 11:00	United States	10 – 0 (2–0, 4–0, 4–0)	Germany	E Center, West Valley City; Attendance: 8,504

14 February 2002; 11:00	Finland	3 – 1 (1–0, 2–0, 0–1)	Germany	Peaks Ice Arena, Provo; Attendance: 4,769

16 February 2002; 14:00	Germany	5 – 5 (1–1, 1–4, 3–0)	China	Peaks Ice Arena, Provo; Attendance: 5,418

==== Classification round ====
5th place semi-final

17 February 2002; 21:00	Germany	4 – 0 (1–0, 3–0, 0–0)	Kazakhstan	E Center, West Valley City; Attendance: 7,773

5th place game

19 February 2002; 19:00	Russia	5 – 0 (2–0, 1–0, 2–0)	Germany 6th	Peaks Ice Arena, Provo; Attendance: 5,781

Contestants; Maritta Becker; Bettina Evers; Steffi Frühwirt; Claudia Grundmann; Sandra Kinza; Sabrina Kruck; Michaela Lanzl; Nina Linde; Christina Oswald; Franziska Reindl; Nina Ritter; Sabine Rückauer; Anja Scheytt; Jana Schreckenbach; Esther Thyssen; Maren Valenti; Stephanie Wartosch-Kürten; Julia Wierscher; Raffi Wolf; Nina Ziegenhals

== Luge ==
Men

Athlete	Run 1		Run 2		Run 3		Run 4		Total	
Athlete	Time	Rank	Time	Rank	Time	Rank	Time	Rank	Time	Rank
Denis Geppert	44.846	8	44.874	10	44.417	3	45.017	11	2:59.154	7
Karsten Albert	44.718	5	44.767	6	44.467	5	45.094	16	2:59.046	6
Georg Hackl	44.614	2	44.494	1	44.487	6	44.675	3	2:58.270	2nd place, silver medalist(s)

(Men's) Doubles

Athletes	Run 1		Run 2		Total	
Athletes	Time	Rank	Time	Rank	Time	Rank
Steffen Skel; Steffen Wöller	43.121	4	43.254	5	1:26.375	4
Alexander Resch; Patric Leitner	42.953	1	43.129	2	1:26.082	1st place, gold medalist(s)

Women

Athlete	Run 1		Run 2		Run 3		Run 4		Total	
Athlete	Time	Rank	Time	Rank	Time	Rank	Time	Rank	Time	Rank
Sylke Otto	43.356	3	43.076	1	42.940	1	43.092	2	2:52.464	1st place, gold medalist(s)
Barbara Niedernhuber	43.346	2	43.134	2	43.215	3	43.090	1	2:52.785	2nd place, silver medalist(s)
Silke Kraushaar	43.294	1	43.224	3	43.195	2	43.152	3	2:52.865	3rd place, bronze medalist(s)

== Nordic combined ==
Men's sprint

Events:

- large hill ski jumping
- 7.5 km cross-country skiing (Start delay, based on ski jumping results.)

Athlete	Ski Jumping		Cross-country time	Total rank
Athlete	Points	Rank	Cross-country time	Total rank
Jens Gaiser	102.4	22	18:19.3	23
Björn Kircheisen	105.8	15	17:45.2	9
Marcel Höhlig	111.6	8	18:32.2	25
Ronny Ackermann	119.9	2	16:49.1	2nd place, silver medalist(s)

Men's individual

Events:

- normal hill ski jumping
- 15 km cross-country skiing (Start delay, based on ski jumping results.)

Athlete	Ski Jumping		Cross-country time	Total rank
Athlete	Points	Rank	Cross-country time	Total rank
Sebastian Haseney	199.0	38	43:37.0	21
Georg Hettich	209.5	32	45:17.8	34
Björn Kircheisen	232.0	14	40:55.9	5
Ronny Ackermann	254.0	5	40:27.8	4

Men's Team

Four participants per team.

Events:

- normal hill ski jumping
- 5 km cross-country skiing (Start delay, based on ski jumping results.)

Athletes	Ski jumping		Cross-country time	Total rank
Athletes	Points	Rank	Cross-country time	Total rank
Björn Kircheisen; Georg Hettich; Marcel Höhlig; Ronny Ackermann	893.5	5	48:49.7	2nd place, silver medalist(s)

== Short track speed skating ==
Men

Athlete	Event	Round one		Quarter finals		Semi finals		Finals	
Athlete	Event	Time	Rank	Time	Rank	Time	Rank	Time	Final rank
Arian Nachbar	500 m	44.057	2 Q	43.626	4	did not advance			
Arian Nachbar	1000 m	1:33.585	3	did not advance					
André Hartwig	1500 m	2:22.541	2 Q			2:25.936	6	did not advance	

Women

Athlete	Event	Round one		Quarter finals		Semi finals		Finals	
Athlete	Event	Time	Rank	Time	Rank	Time	Rank	Time	Final rank
Yvonne Kunze	500 m	45.717	2 Q	46.465	4	did not advance			
Susanne Rudolph	500 m	45.288	3	did not advance					
Christin Priebst	1000 m	1:49.569	2 Q	1:36.848	4	did not advance			
Yvonne Kunze	1000 m	1:42.389	2 Q	1:35.830	4	did not advance			
Yvonne Kunze	1500 m	2:29.779	5	did not advance					
Christin Priebst	1500 m	2:27.649	3 Q			2:32.884	4 QB	2:32.442	8
Yvonne Kunze; Christin Priebst; Ulrike Lehmann; Aika Klein	3000 m relay					4:22.917	4 QB	4:22.222	8

== Skeleton ==
Men

Athlete	Run 1		Run 2		Total	
Athlete	Time	Rank	Time	Rank	Time	Rank
Willi Schneider	51.67	10	51.47	8	1:43.14	9
Frank Kleber	51.58	8	51.76	13	1:43.34	11

Women

Athlete	Run 1		Run 2		Total	
Athlete	Time	Rank	Time	Rank	Time	Rank
Steffi Hanzlik	52.82	6	53.13	8	1:45.95	7
Diana Sartor	52.55	4	52.98	5	1:45.53	4

== Ski jumping ==
Athlete	Event	Qualifying jump			Final jump 1			Final jump 2		Total	
Athlete	Event	Distance	Points	Rank	Distance	Points	Rank	Distance	Points	Points	Rank
Christof Duffner	Normal hill	91.5	117.5	7 Q	91.5	117.5	14 Q	92.0	117.5	235.0	17
Michael Uhrmann	Normal hill	92.0	118.0	5 Q	92.0	118.0	12 Q	95.5	127.0	245.0	8
Martin Schmitt	Normal hill	Pre-qualified			94.5	125.5	6 Q	94.5	124.5	250.0	7
Sven Hannawald	Normal hill	Pre-qualified			97.0	131.0	2 Q	99.0	136.5	267.5	2nd place, silver medalist(s)
Michael Uhrmann	Large hill	119.0	111.2	6 Q	124.0	120.2	14 Q	119.0	112.2	232.4	16
Martin Schmitt	Large hill	Pre-qualified			126.0	127.3	6 Q	119.5	113.1	240.4	10
Stephan Hocke	Large hill	Pre-qualified			125.0	123.5	9 Q	120.5	113.4	236.9	12
Sven Hannawald	Large hill	Pre-qualified			132.5	140.5	1 Q	131.0	114.8	255.3	4

Men's team large hill

Athletes	Result	
Athletes	Points ^{1}	Rank
Sven Hannawald; Stephan Hocke; Michael Uhrmann; Martin Schmitt	974.1	1st place, gold medalist(s)

^{1} Four teams members performed two jumps each.

== Snowboarding ==
Men's parallel giant slalom

Athlete	Qualifying		Round one	Quarter final	Semi final	Final	Rank
Athlete	Time	Rank	Round one	Quarter final	Semi final	Final	Rank
Markus Ebner	37.64	18	did not advance				
Mathias Behounek	37.31	13 Q	(Sweden) Richard Richardsson L	did not advance			

Men's halfpipe

Athlete	Qualifying round 1		Qualifying round 2		Final	
Athlete	Points	Rank	Points	Rank	Points	Rank
Daniel Tyrkas	22.5	25	21.4	26	did not advance	
Xaver Hoffmann	32.3	14	32.6	14	did not advance	
Jan Michaelis	39.7	5 QF			0.2	12

Women's parallel giant slalom

Athlete	Qualifying		Round one	Quarter final	Semi final	Final	Rank
Athlete	Time	Rank	Round one	Quarter final	Semi final	Final	Rank
Heidi Renoth	43.54	21	did not advance				
Katharina Himmler	42.54	11 Q	(Italy) Isabella Dal Balcon L	did not advance			

Women's halfpipe

Athlete	Qualifying round 1		Qualifying round 2		Final	
Athlete	Points	Rank	Points	Rank	Points	Rank
Sabine Wehr-Hasler	22.1	17	29.7	8	did not advance	
Nicola Thost	34.3	4 QF			27.7	11

== Speed skating ==
Men

Event	Athlete	Race 1		Race 2		Total	
Event	Athlete	Time	Rank	Time	Rank	Time	Rank
500 m	Jan Friesinger	36.80	32	DNF	–	DNF	–
500 m	Christian Breuer	36.50	31	35.57	27	72.07	26
500 m	Michael Künzel	35.47	18	35.37	25	70.84	19
1000 m	Jan Friesinger					1:10.71	34
1000 m	Christian Breuer					1:10.38	30
1000 m	Michael Künzel					1:09.64	24
1500 m	Christian Breuer					DNF	–
1500 m	Frank Dittrich					1:51.02	43
1500 m	Jan Friesinger					1:50.26	41
5000 m	René Taubenrauch					7:19.76	32
5000 m	Frank Dittrich					6:25.89	9
5000 m	Jens Boden					6:21.73	3rd place, bronze medalist(s)
10,000 m	Frank Dittrich					13:28.73	10
10,000 m	Jens Boden					13:23.43	5

Women

Event	Athlete	Race 1		Race 2		Total	
Event	Athlete	Time	Rank	Time	Rank	Time	Rank
500 m	Marion Wohlrab	38.66	19	38.71	17	77.37	19
500 m	Jenny Wolf	38.36	16	38.37	13	76.73	15
500 m	Sabine Völker	37.62	5	37.57	2	75.19	3rd place, bronze medalist(s)
500 m	Monique Garbrecht-Enfeldt	37.34	2	37.60	3	74.94	2nd place, silver medalist(s)
1000 m	Marion Wohlrab					1:16.51	21
1000 m	Monique Garbrecht-Enfeldt					1:14.60	6
1000 m	Anni Friesinger					1:14.47	5
1000 m	Sabine Völker					1:13.96	2nd place, silver medalist(s)
1500 m	Marion Wohlrab					1:59.67	22
1500 m	Claudia Pechstein					1:55.93	6
1500 m	Sabine Völker					1:54.97	2nd place, silver medalist(s)
1500 m	Anni Friesinger					1:54.02 WR	1st place, gold medalist(s)
3000 m	Daniela Anschütz					4:07.55	12
3000 m	Anni Friesinger					3:59.39	4
3000 m	Claudia Pechstein					3:57.70 WR	1st place, gold medalist(s)
5000 m	Daniela Anschütz					7:10.17	12
5000 m	Anni Friesinger					6:58.39	6
5000 m	Claudia Pechstein					6:46.91 WR	1st place, gold medalist(s)
