= Ice hockey at the 2002 Winter Olympics – Women's tournament final =

2002 Winter Olympic women's ice hockey final
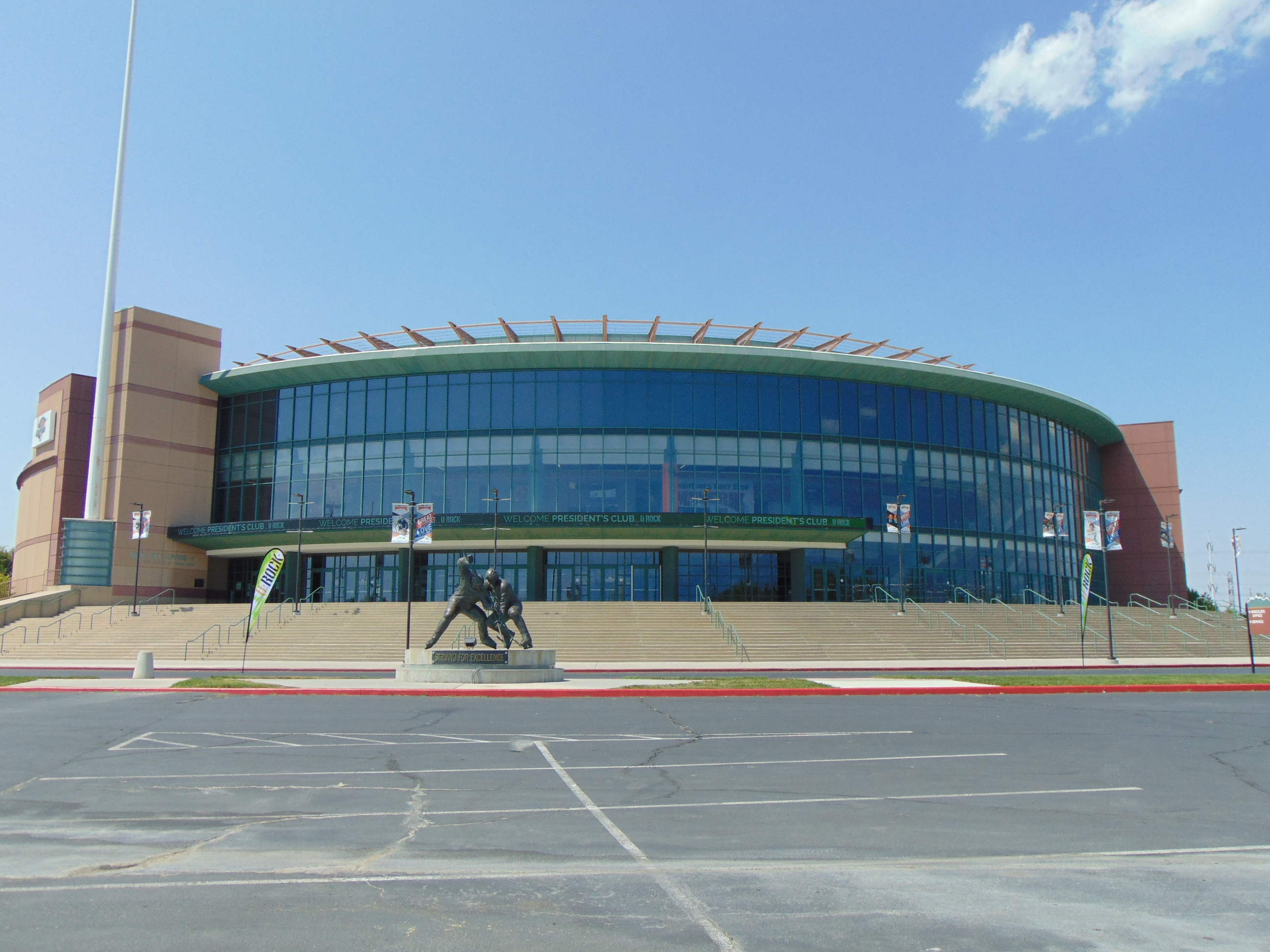
- E Center in West Valley City hosted the final.
	1	2	3	Total
United States	0	1	1	2
Canada	1	2	0	3
- Date: 2 February 2002
- Arena: E Center
- City: West Valley City

The 2002 Winter Olympic ice hockey gold medal match was an ice hockey match held on 2 February 2002 at E Center in West Valley City, United States, between title holders the United States and reigning World Champions Canada to determine the winners of women's ice hockey tournament at the 2002 Winter Olympics.

Canada won the match 3–2 securing a their first Olympic title.

== Background ==
Both teams entered the tournament as the reigning champions of either the Ice hockey at the Olympic Games tournament (United States) or the IIHF Women's World Championship (Canada).

== Route to the final ==
=== United States ===
United States' route to the final
Match	Opponent	Result
1	Germany	10–0
2	China	12–1
3	Finland	12–1
SF	Sweden	4–0

The United States qualified for the tournament by being ranked in the top six following the 2000 IIHF Women's World Championship.

=== Canada ===
Canada's route to the final
Match	Opponent	Result
1	Kazakhstan	7–0
2	Russia	7–0
3	Sweden	11–0
SF	Finland	7–3

Canada also qualified by placing in the top six. For the finals tournament, they were place into Group A alongside Sweden, Russia and Kazakhstan.

== Match ==
=== Details ===
21 February 2002; 17:10	United States	2–3 (0–1, 1–2, 1–0)	Canada	E Center, West Valley City; Attendance: 8,599

Game reference

Sara DeCosta
Goalies
Kim St-Pierre
Referee:
(United States) Stacey Livingston
Linesmen:
(Finland) Johanna Suban
(Slovakia) Henrieta Hujdušová

	0–1	01:45 − Ouellette (Piper)
King (Granato, Mounsey) (PP) − 21:59	1–1
	1–2	24:10 − Wickenheiser (Goyette)
	1–3	39:59 − Hefford (Kellar, Brisson)
Bye (Mounsey, Potter) (PP) − 56:27	2–3

12 min
Penalties
26 min
27
Shots
29
