= 1999–2000 NWHL season =

== 1999-2000 ==
=== Final standings ===
Note: GP = Games played, W = Wins, L = Losses, T = Ties, GF = Goals for, GA = Goals against, Pts = Points.

Eastern Division
No.	Team	GP	W	L	T	GF	GA	Pts
1	Sainte Julie Pantheres	35	20	8	7	109	68	47
2	Montreal Wingstar	35	18	7	10	116	62	46
3	Ottawa Raiders	35	9	20	6	61	109	24
4	Laval Le Mistral	35	7	23	5	78	177	19

Western Division
No.	Team	GP	W	L	T	GF	GA	Pts
1	Beatrice Aeros	40	35	3	2	217	37	72
2	Brampton Thunder	40	29	5	6	208	64	64
3	Mississauga Chiefs	40	21	13	6	133	79	48
4	Clearnet Lightning	40	4	33	3	44	249	11
5	Scarborough Sting	40	3	34	3	49	170	9

== Playoffs ==
=== Eastern Division Final ===
Montreal Wingstar vs Sainte-Julie Pantheres

- Saturday March 4, 2000: Sainte-Julie Pantheres 6 Montreal Wingstar 0
- Sunday March 5, 2000: Montreal Wingstar 2 Sainte-Julie Pantheres 1
- Sunday March 5, 2000: Overtime tiebreaker: Montreal Wingstar 0 Sainte-Julie Panthères 1

Sainte-Julie Pantheres wins series 1–1 (1–0 win in overtime tiebreaker)

=== Western Division Final ===
Brampton Thunder vs Beatrice Aeros

- Saturday March 4, 2000 : Beatrice Aeros 4 Brampton Thunder 3
- Monday, March 6, 2000: Brampton Thunder 2 Beatrice Aeros 4

Beatrice Aeros win series 2–0

=== NWHL Finals ===
In the first game, the Sainte-Julie Pantheres came back and tied the game 2-2. In the deciding game, Beatrice Aeros player Cherie Piper scored in the first period. That would prove to be the game-winning goal as Beatrice claimed the championship by a 1–0 score. Lauren Goldstein earned the shutout for the Aeros. Goaltender Marie-Claude Roy of the Sainte-Julie Pantheres was selected MVP for the Finals. She stopped 80 of 83 shots in the two game series.

- March 18, 2000: Sainte-Julie Pantheres 2, Beatrice Aeros 2
- March 19, 2000: Beatrice Aeros 1, Sainte-Julie Panthere 0

Beatrice Aeros wins title based on most goals scored.

The Beatrice Aeros won the Championship of the NWHL.

== Team by team ==
=== Laval Le Mistral ===
In 1999–2000, Laval Le Mistral's Annie Desrosiers was second in the league in goals with 29. Her 45 points ranked eleventh in the league. She was an assistant captain despite being a 20-year-old. For the 2000–01 season, the team captain was 21-year-old Anik Bouchard. Two members of the Japanese National Team competed for Le Mistral. Masako Sato was second in team scoring in 1999–2000, and her sister Rie played only one season (1999–2000).

During the 1999–2000 season, Le Mistral allowed an average of five goals per game, second last in the NWHL. Goaltender Marieve Dyotte was 5-10-1 with a 6.44 goals against average, while Vania Goeury was 2-14-3 with 4.08 GAA. During the season, Laval received 605 penalty minutes. The result was allowing 44 goals in 35 games. Anik Bouchard had 91 minutes, Chartrand (88 minutes) and Valerie Levesque had 60 minutes.

=== Sainte-Julie Pantheres ===
During the 1999–2000 season, Sainte-Julie Pantheres finished ahead of the Montreal Wingstar in first place by one point. The club defeated Laval and Montreal in the playoffs, and faced the Beatrice Aeros in the finals in Brampton, Ont.

In the net, Marie-Claude Roy compiled an 11-6-4 record and a 2.02 Goals against average. The other goalie, Isabelle Leclaire, posted a 9-2-2 record and a 1.95 GAA. National team member Nancy Drolet scored 29 goals and added 17 assists. Mai-Lan Le scored 31 points in 31 games.

== International ==
The NWHL had 18 players represent their respective countries at the 2000 Women's World Hockey Championships in Mississauga, Ontario. Rob Insley, of the Beatrice Aeros, will be equipment manager for Team Canada.

Player	Team	Position	Country
Sami Jo Small	Brampton Thunder	Goalie	Canada
Chris Bailey	Ottawa Raiders	Defense	USA
Therese Brisson	Montréal Wingstar	Defense	Canada
Geraldine Heaney	Beatrice Aeros	Defense	Canada
Becky Kellar	Beatrice Aeros	Defense	Canada
Sue Merz	Brampton Thunder	Defense	USA
Cheryl Pounder	Beatrice Aeros	Defense	Canada
Nathalie Rivard	Mississauga Chiefs	Defense	Canada
Rie Sato	Laval Le Mistral	Defense	Japan
Amanda Benoit	Beatrice Aeros	Forward	Canada
Cassie Campbell	Beatrice Aeros	Forward	Canada
Nancy Drolet	Saint-Julie Panthères	Forward	Canada
Lori Dupuis	Brampton Thunder	Forward	Canada
Brandy Fisher	Ottawa Raiders	Forward	USA
Jayna Hefford	Brampton Thunder	Forward	Canada
Caroline Ouellette	Montréal Wingstar	Forward	Canada
Masako Sato	Laval Le Mistral	Forward	Japan
Vicky Sunohara	Brampton Thunder	Forward	Canada

== See also ==
- National Women's Hockey League (1999–2007) (NWHL)
