= Kinza (name) =

Kinza is a given name and surname. Notable people with the name include:

== People with the given name ==
- Kinza Clodumar, Nauruan politician
- Kinza Hashmi, Pakistani actress
- Kinza Malik, Pakistani actress
- Kinza Razzak, Pakistani actress and model

== People with the surname ==
- Sandra Kinza, German ice hockey player

== See also ==
- A Gift for Kinza, a 1951 short story by Paul Bowles
