= Bemidji State Beavers women's ice hockey =

American college ice hockey team

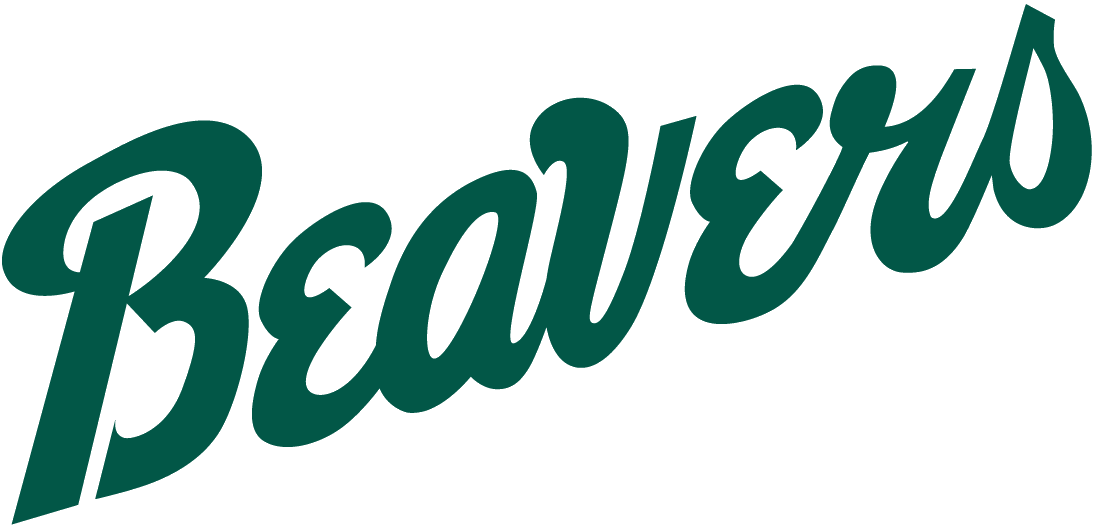
- University: Bemidji State
- Conference: WCHA
- Head coach: Amber Fryklund; 1st season, 0–0–0
- Arena: Sanford Center; Bemidji, Minnesota
- Colors: Green and white

The Bemidji State Beavers are a women's college hockey team representing Bemidji State University in Bemidji, Minnesota, United States. They play at the NCAA Division I level, and compete in the Western Collegiate Hockey Association (WCHA).

== History ==
The Bemidji State University intercollegiate women's ice hockey program began competition in the 1998–1999 season. The first head coach was Ruthann Cantile. She was head coach from the program's founding to the start of WCHA play, and the beginning of national NCAA Championships in 2001.

Over the next several years, Bemidji State met with little success, while playing against the best teams in the nation, in conference play. The Beavers were able to recruit 2002 German Olympian Defender Nina Zieganhals in 2003. After disappointing seasons under Jason Lesterberg (2000–01) and Bruce Olson, who left the program during the 2005–06 season, Bemidji State hired Steve Sertich for the 2006–07 season. Sertich presided over the team for eight years until his retirement in 2014.

On February 27, 2010, Bemidji State ended its 14-game playoff losing streak in a 2–1 victory over St. Cloud State. The next day, the Beavers defeated St. Cloud State in Game 3, and advanced to the WCHA Final Face-Off for the first time in school history. Zuzana Tomcikova had 27 saves and the win was the Beavers 12th win of the season. It tied the school record for most wins in a season (accomplished in 2001–02). The Beavers advanced to play the Minnesota Duluth Bulldogs in the WCHA semi-finals but were eliminated.

On October 16, 2010, Beaver goaltender Alana McElhinney made a career-high 56 saves. In the game, Bemidji State had its first-ever win over a No. 1-ranked team as they defeated the Mercyhurst Lakers by a 5–3 mark. In addition, this was the second women's game ever played at the new Bemidji Regional Event Center.

October 29–30, 2010: Erin Cody had the biggest weekend of her collegiate career. She was involved in all seven of the Bemidji State's goals, as the Beavers swept St. Cloud State. Cody had five goals and two assists, and was a factor in both game-winning goals. Cody earned the First Star of the Game honors in both games. In the first game, Cody scored a natural hat trick (a power-play, shorthanded, and even-strength goal). All three goals were scored in the first period and set a Beavers record for most goals scored by a single player in one period. In the second game, Cody had two goals and two assists.

On January 28, 2012, the Badgers hosted a record crowd of 12,402 at the Kohl Center as Wisconsin swept the Bemidji State Beavers. Alex Rigby made 28 saves to obtain her sixth shutout of the campaign. Her rival between the pipes, Bemidji State goaltender Zuzana Tomcikova made 32 saves.

The Beavers made history on March 7, 2015, as they defeated the Minnesota Golden Gophers by a 1–0 tally in the semifinals of the WCHA Final Face-Off. The game-winning goal was scored by Stephanie Anderson in the third period. Beavers goaltender Brittni Mowat made 37 saves, registering her seventh shutout of the season, a new program record. In addition, it marked the first time that the Beavers advanced to the championship game of the WCHA Final Face-Off.

On February 29, 2020, the Bemidji State Beavers beat the Minnesota Duluth Bulldogs in the fourth overtime period of their WCHA Quarterfinal match, making it in the longest game in WCHA women's ice hockey history, and the second longest in NCAA history. Beaver forward Reece Hunt scored the game-winning goal at 8:43 of the fourth overtime. The game lasted four hours and 50 minutes, with 128:43 of on-ice time. The final score was 2–1. The victory marked Jim Scanlon's 100th win as head coach for Bemidji; he is the first coach in the women's ice hockey program's history to reach 100 wins.

=== Year by year ===
Won championship	Lost championship	Conference champions	League leader

Year	Coach	W	L	T	Conference	Conf. W	Conf. L	Conf. T	Finish	Conference Tournament	NCAA Tournament
2024–25	Amber Fryklund	6	30	1	WCHA	4	24	0	8th WCHA	Lost Quarterfinals vs. Wisconsin (0–3, 0–11)	Did not qualify
2023–24	Jim Scanlan	4	30	2	WCHA	3	24	1	8th WCHA	Lost Quarterfinals vs. Ohio State (1–10, 0–8)	Did not qualify
2022–23	Jim Scanlan	5	30	1	WCHA	2	26	0	8th WCHA	Lost Quarterfinals vs. Ohio State (1–4, 1–2)	Did not qualify
2021–22	Jim Scanlan	11	20	3	WCHA	8	18	2	6th WCHA	Lost Quarterfinals vs. Wisconsin (1–2, 0–5)	Did not qualify
2020–21	Jim Scanlan	2	16	2	WCHA	2	16	2	7th WCHA	Did not qualify	Did not qualify
2019–20	Jim Scanlan	16	18	3	WCHA	9	13	2	5th WCHA	Lost Quarterfinals vs. Minnesota–Duluth (1–2, 2–1, 1–4)	Did not qualify
2018–19	Jim Scanlan	13	21	2	WCHA	10	12	2	5th WCHA	Lost Quarterfinals vs. Minnesota–Duluth (2–3, 3–4)	Did not qualify
2017–18	Jim Scanlan	16	19	3	WCHA	9	13	2	5th WCHA	Won Quarterfinals vs. Minnesota–Duluth (2–1, 1–4, 3–0); Lost Semifinals vs. Wisconsin (1–4)	Did not qualify
2016–17	Jim Scanlan	12	20	3	WCHA	7	18	3	7th WCHA	Lost Quarterfinals vs. Minnesota (1–3, 2–1, 2–3 )	Did not qualify
2015–16	Jim Scanlan	22	11	3	WCHA	19	9	2	3rd WCHA	Lost Quarterfinals vs. Minnesota–Duluth (1–5, 1–2 OT)	Did not qualify
2014–15	Jim Scanlan	21	17	1	WCHA	13	14	1	5th WCHA	Won Quarterfinals vs. Minnesota–Duluth (3–2, 0–2, 2–1 OT); Won Semifinals vs. Minnesota (1–0); Lost Championship vs. Wisconsin (0–4)	Did not qualify
2013–14	Steve Sertich	11	21	4	WCHA	8	17	3	6th WCHA	Lost Quarterfinals to North Dakota (1–4, 2–3 OT)	Did not qualify
2012–13	Steve Sertich	6	26	2	WCHA	5	22	1	8th WCHA	Lost Quarterfinals to Minnesota (0–5, 0–8)	Did not qualify
2011–12	Steve Sertich	17	17	3	WCHA	11	15	2	6th WCHA	Lost Quarterfinals vs. North Dakota (1–3, 0–2)	Did not qualify
2010–11	Steve Sertich	14	17	4	WCHA	11	13	4	5th WCHA	Lost Quarterfinals vs. North Dakota (2–3, 3–0, 2–3 OT)	Did not qualify
2009–10	Steve Sertich	12	19	7	WCHA	9	12	7	6th WCHA	Won Quarterfinals vs. St. Cloud State (0–3, 2–1, 4–1); Lost Semifinals vs. Minnesota–Duluth (2–7)	Did not qualify
2008–09	Steve Sertich	6	25	5	WCHA	3	22	3	8th WCHA	Lost Quarterfinals vs. Minnesota (1–4, 1–5)	Did not qualify
2007–08	Steve Sertich	4	29	3	WCHA	1	25	2	8th WCHA	Lost Quarterfinals vs. Minnesota–Duluth (0–6, 1–5)	Did not qualify
2006–07	Steve Sertich	11	20	5	WCHA	9	15	4	6th WCHA	Lost Quarterfinals vs. Minnesota (1–5, 1–4)	Did not qualify
2005–06	Bruce Olson; Interim: Jim Ingman, Sis Paulsen	11	23	2	WCHA	10	18	0	6th WCHA	Lost Quarterfinals vs. Minnesota–Duluth (2–7, 0–3)	Did not qualify
2004–05	Bruce Olson	9	24	2	WCHA	5	22	1	8th WCHA	Lost Quarterfinals vs. Minnesota (3–6)	Did not qualify
2003–04	Bruce Olson	5	27	2	WCHA	3	20	1	7th WCHA	Did not qualify	Did not qualify
2002–03	Bruce Olson	9	17	7	WCHA	5	13	6	5th WCHA	Lost Quarterfinals vs. Ohio State (3–4 OT)	Did not qualify
2001–02	Jason Lesteberg	12	13	8	WCHA	7	11	6	5th WCHA	Lost Quarterfinals vs. Ohio State (3–5)	Did not qualify
2000–01	Ruthann Cantile	9	24	1	WCHA	6	17	1	6th WCHA	Lost Quarterfinals vs. Wisconsin (2–5)	Did not qualify
1999–00	Ruthann Cantile	15	18	2	WCHA	5	17	2	6th WCHA	Lost Quarterfinals vs. Wisconsin (2–9)	Did not qualify
1998–99	Ruthann Cantile	2	20	0	WCHA						

== Current roster ==
As of February 24, 2025

No.	Nat.	Player	Class	Pos	Height	DoB	Hometown	Previous team
1	(United States)	Kaitlin Groess	Freshman	G	5' 7" (1.7 m)	2006-04-21	Ham Lake, Minnesota	Centennial-Spring Lake Park High School Co-op (MSHSL)
2	(United States)	Makenna Deering	Senior	D	5' 6" (1.68 m)	2003-01-08	South St. Paul, Minnesota	South St. Paul Secondary (MSHSL)
3	(United States)	Olivia Dronen	Sophomore	D	5' 6" (1.68 m)	2005-05-03	Moorhead, Minnesota	Moorhead High School (MSHSL)
4	(United States)	Meredith Killian	Graduate	D	5' 7" (1.7 m)	2001-11-29	Saint Paul, Minnesota	Union College (ECAC Hockey)
5	(United States)	Ana Davis	Sophomore	D	5' 7" (1.7 m)	2004-09-20	Minneapolis, Minnesota	Minneapolis High School Co-op (MSHSL)
6	(United States)	Hannah Graves	Freshman	F	5' 9" (1.75 m)	2006-07-25	Hermantown, Minnesota	Proctor-Hermantown High School Co-op (MSHSL)
7	(United States)	Shelby Breiland	Senior	F	5' 7" (1.7 m)	2002-08-19	Red Lake Falls, Minnesota	Thief River Falls High School (MSHSL)
8	(United States)	Avery Achterkirch	Freshman	F	5' 4" (1.63 m)	2005-08-27	Rogers, Minnesota	Rogers High School (MSHSL)
9	(United States)	Isa Goettl	Freshman (RS)	F	5' 7" (1.7 m)	2004-10-09	Andover, Minnesota	University of Minnesota (WCHA)
10	(United States)	Raeley Carney	Junior	F	5' 7" (1.7 m)	2004-02-12	Wasilla, Alaska	Alaska All Stars (19U AAA)
11	(United States)	Genevieve Hendrickson	Senior	F	5' 6" (1.68 m)	2002-11-24	Warroad, Minnesota	Franklin Pierce University (NEWHA)
13	(United States)	Talya Hendrickson	Sophomore	F	5' 5" (1.65 m)	2005-06-21	Warroad, Minnesota	Warroad High School (MSHSL)
14	(United States)	Kate Johnson	Sophomore	F	5' 4" (1.63 m)	2005-05-01	Warroad, Minnesota	Warroad High School (MSHSL)
15	(United States)	Shelby Sandberg	Sophomore	F	5' 4" (1.63 m)	2005-06-15	Ham Lake, Minnesota	Blaine High School (MSHSL)
16	(United States)	Alyssa Watkins	Sophomore	F	5' 7" (1.7 m)	2003-08-13	Hermantown, Minnesota	Proctor-Hermantown High School Co-op (MSHSL)
17	(Germany)	Heidi Strompf	Junior	D	5' 5" (1.65 m)	2002-09-10	Ingolstadt, Germany	ŽHK Šarišanka Prešov (SŽHL)
18	(United States)	Riley Reeves	Sophomore	D	5' 8" (1.73 m)	2005-01-26	Woodbury, Minnesota	Gentry Academy (MSHSL)
21	(Canada)	Morgan Smith	Freshman	F	5' 8" (1.73 m)	2006-02-03	Winnipeg, Manitoba	Balmoral Hall (JWHL)
22	(United States)	Autumn Cooper	Freshman	F	5' 7" (1.7 m)	2005-09-21	South Range, Wisconsin	Superior High School (Wisconsin Prep)
23	(Poland)	Julia Zielińska	Freshman	D	5' 6" (1.68 m)	2004-12-30	Katowice, Poland	Kiekko-Espoo (NSML)
25	(United States)	Izy Fairchild	Freshman	F	5' 2" (1.57 m)	2006-05-18	Hermantown, Minnesota	Proctor-Hermantown High School Co-op (MSHSL)
26	(Canada)	Kendra Fortin	Senior	D	5' 4" (1.63 m)	2003-01-31	Thunder Bay, Ontario	Etobicoke Jr. Dolphins (OWHL)
27	(Canada)	Mya Headrick	Junior	F	5' 8" (1.73 m)	2004-11-29	Garden River, Ontario	Etobicoke Jr. Dolphins (OWHL)
29	(Canada)	Hailey Armstrong	Sophomore	F	5' 6" (1.68 m)	2005-04-29	Dawson Creek, British Columbia	RINK Hockey Academy Kelowna (CSSHL)
30	(Russia)	Eva Filippova	Sophomore	G	5' 5" (1.65 m)	2004-05-18	Khanty-Mansiysk, Russia	RINK Hockey Academy Kelowna (CSSHL)
33	(United States)	Josie Bothun	Graduate	G	5' 6" (1.68 m)	2002-05-18	Wyoming, Minnesota	Pennsylvania State University (AHA)
35	(Canada)	Lauren Mooney	Freshman	G	5' 10" (1.78 m)	2006-06-01	Caledon, Ontario	Burlington Jr. Barracudas (OWHL)

== Olympians ==
- Nina Ziegenhals, defenseman, Germany; 2002 Winter Olympics
- Zuzana Tomcikova, goaltender, Slovak Republic; 2010 Winter Olympics

== World Championships ==
- Stephanie Anderson, forward, North St. Paul, Minn. First Beaver player to win a gold medal in a world championship on April 4, 2015 when the United States National Team defeated Canada 7–5 to capture the 2015 IIHF World Championships in Malmo, Sweden.
- Ivana Bilic, played for Team Canada's Development Team, in the 2016 Nations Cup, January 4–6, 2016.

== Beavers in professional hockey ==
= CWHL All-Star	= NWHL All-Star	= Clarkson Cup Champion	= Isobel Cup Champion	= Walter Cup Champion

Player	Position	Team(s)	League(s)	Years	Clarkson Cup	Isobel Cup	Walter Cup
Eva Maria Beiter-Schwärzler		DSC Oberthurgau	Swiss Women's A				
Stephanie Anderson		Minnesota Whitecaps (2016-17, 2019-2023), Kunlun Red Star (2017-18), Shenzhen KRS Vanke Rays (2018-19)	NWHL, PHF, CWHL				
Ivana Bilic	Defense	Connecticut Whale; Modo (2018–19); Brynäs IF(2019–20)	NWHL; SDHL				
Tess Dusik		Göteborg HC	Swedish Hockey League Dam Div1				
Clair DeGeorge	Forward	Minnesota PWHL (2023-34), Montreal Victoire (2024-25), Toronto Sceptres (2025-26)	PWHL				2023-24
Lauren Bench	Forward	MoDo Hockey (2022-23), Minnesota PWHL (2023-34), Djurgårdens IF (women's ice hockey) (2025-26)	PWHL Swedish Women's Hockey League				2023-24
Haley Mack		Minnesota Whitecaps	NWHL (2020-2021)				
Jenn Sadler		Mississauga Chiefs	CWHL				
Zuzana Tomčíková	Goaltender	Moscow Tornado	EWCC-Women				

== Awards and honors ==
- Reece Hunt, WCHA Rookie of the Month (February 2020)
- Lauren Bench, WCHA Goaltender of the Month (December 2019)
- Kerigan Dowhy, WCHA Goaltender of the Month (February 2018)
- Ivana Bilic, 2016 WCHA Defensive Player of the Year
- Brittni Mowat, Goaltender, 2015 All-USCHO.com Women's Second-Team
- Jim Scanlan, Head Coach, 2015 USCHO.com National Coach of the Year
- Alexis Joyce, Defenseman, 2015 All-WCHA Rookie Team
- Alexis Joyce, WCHA Defensive Player of the Week (Week of January 24, 2017)
- Mak Langei, 2020-21 WCHA Student-Athlete of the Year
- Brittni Mowat, Goaltender, 2015 All-WCHA First Team
- Brittni Mowat, Goaltender, 2015 CCM Hockey Women's Division I All-Americans, First Team
- Zuzana Tomcikova, Goaltender, 2012 CCM Hockey Women's Division I All-American: Second Team
- Zuzana Tomcikova, Goaltender, 2012 Patty Kazmaier Award nominee
- Steve Sertich, Head Coach, 2010 WCHA Coach of the Year
- Zuzana Tomcikova, Goaltender, 2010 Co-WCHA Player of the Year
- Jill Luebke, Goaltender, 2003 WCHA All-Rookie team
- Anik Cote, Goaltender, 2003 WCHA Student Athlete of the Year

== See also ==
- Bemidji State Beavers men's ice hockey
