= Laval Le Mistral =

Laval Le Mistal
- City: Laval, Quebec
- League: National Women's Hockey League
- Division: Eastern
- Founded: 1998
- Folded: 2001
- Home arena: Colisée de Laval
- Colours: Yellow, black & white
- Owners: Jacques Dyotte and Michel Dyotte
- General manager: Michel Dyotte
- Head coach: Marcel Dube
- Captain: Anik Bouchard; Alternate captains: Annie Desrosiers

Laval Le Mistral (1998–2001) was a women's ice hockey team in the National Women's Hockey League (NWHL). The team played its home games in Colisée de Laval in Laval, Quebec, Canada.

== History ==
=== Season-by-season ===
Year by year
Year	GP	W	L	T	GF	GA	Pts
1998–99	34	9	21	4	78	144	22
1999–2000	35	7	23	5	78	177	19
2000–01	40	5	33	2	68	261	12

Note: GP = Games played, W = Wins, L = Losses, T = Ties, GF = Goals for, GA = Goals against, Pts = Points.

=== 1998–99 NWHL Season and playoffs ===
Le Mistral started at the end of the 1997–98 college and university year with a group of players limited experience at the elite Senior AAA level. Le Mistral enter to the NWHL but the team has a difficult first season: In 34 games 9 wins and 21 defeats. For the playoffs, Laval Le mistral was eliminated in Eastern first round: April 10, 1999– Bonaventure Wingstar 4 at Laval Le Mistral 2 and April 11, 1999– Laval Le Mistral 3 at Bonaventure Wingstar 8. The Bonaventure Wingstar wins 2 games and pass to Eastern Division Finals

=== 1999–2000 NWHL season ===
Laval Le Mistral's Annie Desrosiers was second leader in the league in goals with 29. Her 45 points ranked eleventh in the league. She was an assistant captain despite being a 20-year-old. For the 2000–01 season, the team captain was 21-year-old Anik Bouchard. Two members of the Japanese National Team competed for Le Mistral: Masako Sato was second leader in Laval Le Mistral for scoring and her sister the defender Rie Sato . During the season, Le Mistral allowed an average of five goals per game, second last in the NWHL. Goaltender Marieve Dyotte was 5–10–1 with a 6.44 goals against average, while Vania Goeury was 2–14–3 with 4.08 GAA. During the season, Laval received 605 penalty minutes. The result was allowing 44 goals in 35 games. Anik Bouchard had 91 minutes, Isabelle Chartrand (88 minutes) and Valerie Levesque had 60 minutes.

=== 2000–2001 NWHL Eastern Division Playoffs ===
Round 1: Laval Le Mistral vs Sainte-Julie Pantheres

Saturday February 26 and Sunday February 27, the Sainte-Julie Pantheres eliminated the Laval Le Mistral, winning their two-game series 2–0.

== Season standing ==
Year	Regular season	Playoffs
1998–1999	4th Eastern Division	eliminated in first round
1999–2000	4th, Eastern Division	eliminated in first round
2000–2001	4th, Eastern Division	eliminated in first round

== Last roster 2000–01 ==
Goalies
Number		Player	Former Team	Hometown
55	(Canada)	Nancy Morin		
53	(Canada)	Vania Goeury		
49	(Canada)	Penny Peters		
1	(Canada)	Charline Labonté	National Team Canada	Greenfield Park, Quebec

Defense
Number		Player	Former Team	Hometown
27	(Canada)	Marilene Galarneau		
25	(Canada)	Mylene Daneau		
22	(Canada)	Marie Noel Tessier		
19	(Canada)	Laura Leslie		
14	(Canada)	Anik Bouchard		
11	(Canada)	Laura Leslie		
4	(Canada)	Karine Senecal		

Forwards
Number		Player	Former Team	Hometown
96	(Canada)	Annie Desrosiers		
93	(Canada)	Isabelle Giguere		
37	(Canada)	Veronique Sanfacon		
28	(Canada)	Julie Pelletier		
21	(Japan)	Masako Sato	Japan National Team	Tomakomai, Hokkaido, Japan
21	(Canada)	Michelle Fauteux		
17	(Canada)	Vanessa Parent		
16	(Canada)	Genevieve Beauchamps		
9	(Canada)	Valerie St-Jacques		
7	(Canada)	Josee Cournoyer		

== Notable former players ==
- Masako Sato, forward (Japan)
- Rie Sato, defender (Japan)
- Maren Valenti (Germany)
- Isabelle Chartrand, defender, a member of Canada's 1999 National Women's Team.
- Charline Labonte, Goaltender, a member of Canada National Team.

== Award and honour ==
- 1998/99 Eastern Division 1st All Star Team: Annie Desrosiers (forward) and Isabelle Chartrand(defender)
- 1998/99 Eastern Division 2sd All Star Team: Vania Goeury (goalie), Anik Bouchard (defender) and Julie Pelletier (forward)
- 1999/2000 Eastern Division 1st All Star Team: Annie Desrosiers (forward) and Isabelle Chartrand(defender)

== Former Staff ==
- General Manager: Michel Dyotte
- Head Coach: Marcel Dube
- Assistant Coach: Benoit Constantineau
- Assistant Coach: Christian Dugel

== See also ==
- National Women's Hockey League (1999–2007) (NWHL)
