= Nadezhda Loseva =

Kazakhstani ice hockey player

Personal information
- Nationality: Kazakhstani
- Born: 24 December 1974 (age 50); Alma-Ata, Kazakh SSR, Soviet Union

Sport
- Sport: Ice hockey

Nadezhda Loseva (born 24 December 1974) is a Kazakhstani ice hockey player. She competed in the women's tournament at the 2002 Winter Olympics.
