= Rie Sato (ice hockey) =

Japanese ice hockey player

- Born: January 31, 1972 (age 54) Tomakomai, Hokkaido, Japan
- Height: 5 ft 3 in (160 cm)
- Weight: 132 lb (60 kg; 9 st 6 lb)
- Position: Defence
- National team: Japan

Rie Sato (佐藤 理絵, Satō Rie; born January 31, 1972) was an ice hockey player from Japan. She competed for her country in ice hockey at the 1998 Winter Olympics. She also played for Laval Le Mistral a women's ice hockey team in the National Women's Hockey League during the 1999–2000 NWHL season. Her sister Masako Sato also played for Laval Le Mistral.

== Stats ==
Japan National Team

Event	GP	G	A	PTS	PIM	+/-	SOG
1998 Winter Olympics	5	0	0	0	2	-7	2

Laval Le Mistral (NWHL)

Event	GP	G	A	PTS	PIM	+/-	SOG
Season 1999-2000	34	1	2	3	2	0	0
