= Stephanie Anderson =

American ice hockey player

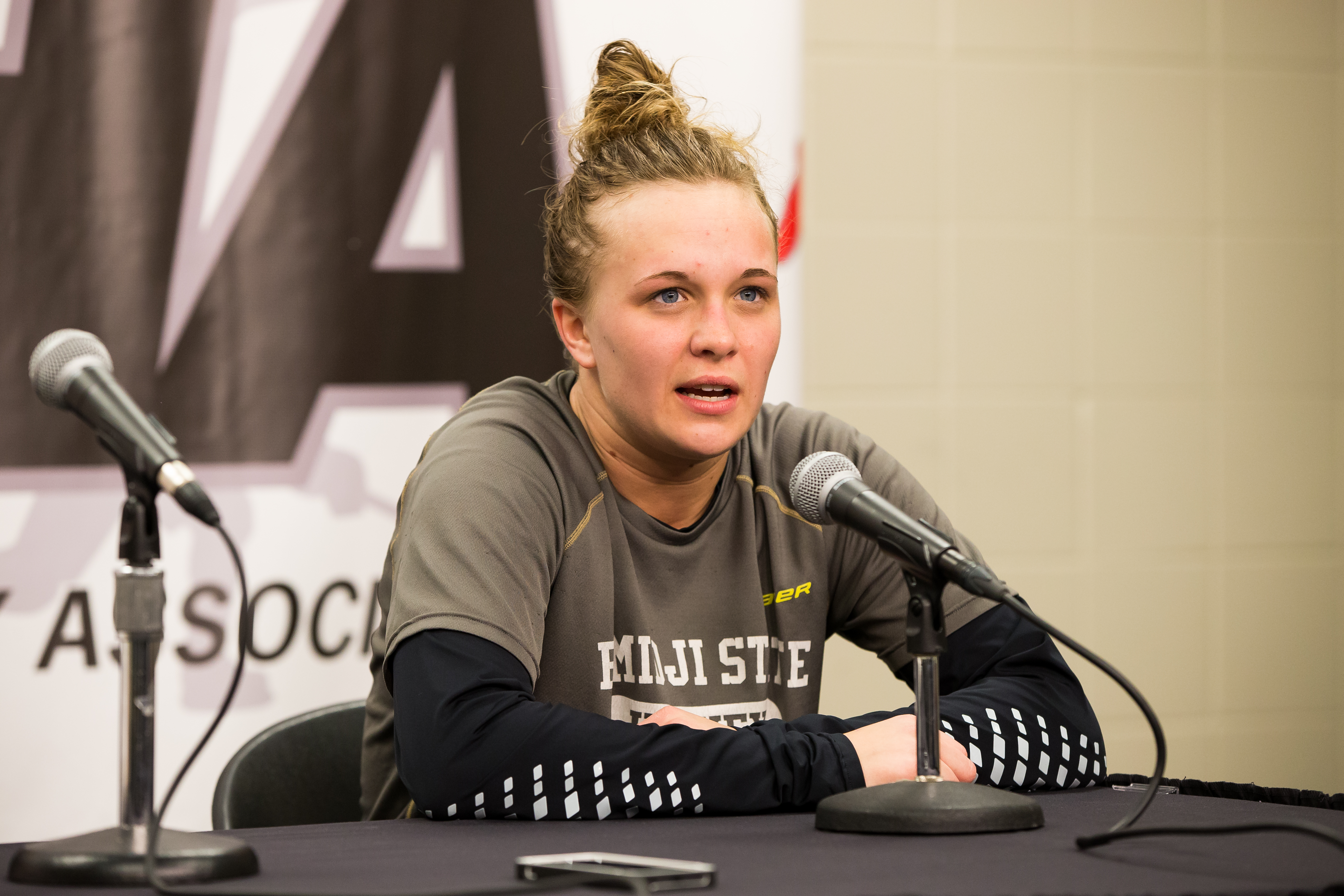
- Anderson addressing the media after her game winning goal in the 2015 WCHA Semifinals
- Born: November 27, 1992 (age 33) North St. Paul, Minnesota, U.S.
- Height: 5 ft 9 in (175 cm)
- Weight: 165 lb (75 kg; 11 st 11 lb)
- Position: Left wing
- Shoots: Left
- PHF team Former teams: Minnesota Whitecaps: Kunlun Red Star (CWHL); Bemidji State Beavers (NCAA); Minnesota Gophers (NCAA)
- National team: United States
- Playing career: 2011–present
Medal record
World Championship
Gold medal – first place	2015 Sweden

Stephanie Anderson (born November 27, 1992) is an American ice hockey player who played for the Minnesota Whitecaps in the now defunct Premier Hockey Federation (PHF). She previously competed for the Bemidji State Beavers women's ice hockey program and was a member of the United States women's national ice hockey team that won the gold medal at the 2015 IIHF Women's World Championship.

== Playing career ==
=== High school ===
Anderson competed at the high school level with the North St. Paul High School team, becoming a two-time letterwinner. In addition, she would skate for the Minnesota Thoroughbreds at the club level, eventually being appointed team captain.

=== NCAA hockey ===
Joining the Minnesota Golden Gophers in the autumn of 2011, Anderson would log her first career goal, a game-winning tally against Minnesota State on October 21, 2011. She would finish her freshman season as a member of the Gophers NCAA Frozen Four title-winning team. Opting to transfer to Bemidji State in 2012, she sat out the 2012–13 due to transfer rules within the WCHA conference. As a redshirt sophomore in 2013–14, she contributed five goals and three assists in 33 games played.

On March 7, 2015, Anderson contributed to a historic win as the Beavers defeated the Minnesota Golden Gophers by a 1–0 tally in the semifinals of the WCHA Final Face-Off. She logged the game-winning goal at the 11:46 mark of the third period. Beavers goaltender Brittni Mowat made 37 saves, registering her seventh shutout of the season, a new program record. In addition, it marked the first time that the Beavers advanced to the championship game of the WCHA Final Face-Off.

=== CWHL ===
In 2017, Anderson signed her first professional contract with Kunlun Red Star of the CWHL. She would put up 25 points in 53 games across two seasons before the league folded.

=== NWHL ===
Anderson signed with the NWHL Minnesota Whitecaps for its 2019–2020 season. She put up 10 points in 22 games in the 2019–20 season.

=== International ===
In 2009, she made her debut for USA Hockey, competing in a three-game exhibition series between the Canadian and US Under-18 rosters. In 2015, she was a member of the gold medal-winning team at the IIHF World Championships

== Career statistics ==
=== Regular season and playoffs ===
			Regular season					Playoffs
Season	Team	League	GP	G	A	Pts	PIM	GP	G	A	Pts	PIM
2011–12	Minnesota Golden Gophers	WCHA	39	1	5	6	6	–	–	–	–	–
2013–14	Bemidji State Beavers	WCHA	33	5	3	8	35	–	–	–	–	–
2014–15	Bemidji State Beavers	WCHA	39	14	10	24	32	–	–	–	–	–
2015–16	Bemidji State Beavers	WCHA	31	11	8	19	20	–	–	–	–	–
2016–17	Minnesota Whitecaps	Ind.	–	–	–	–	–	–	–	–	–	–
2017–18	Kunlun Red Star	CWHL	28	8	9	17	48	4	1	1	2	2
2018–19	Shenzhen KRS Vanke Rays	CWHL	25	5	3	8	20	–	–	–	–	–
2019–20	Minnesota Whitecaps	NWHL	22	4	6	10	12	1	0	0	0	0
2020–21	Minnesota Whitecaps	NWHL	4	0	1	1	0	2	0	1	1	0
2021–22	Minnesota Whitecaps	PHF	15	0	2	2	24	2	0	0	0	0
2022–23	Minnesota Whitecaps	PHF	24	1	2	3	8	3	0	0	0	0
NCAA totals			142	31	26	57	93	–	–	–	–	–
CWHL totals			53	13	12	25	68	4	1	1	2	2
NWHL/PHF totals			65	5	11	16	44	8	0	1	1	0

=== International ===
Year	Team	Event	Result	GP	G	A	Pts	PIM
2010	United States	U18	2nd place, silver medalist(s)	1	0	0	0	2
2015	United States	WC	1st place, gold medalist(s)	4	0	1	1	0
Junior totals				1	0	0	0	2
Senior totals				4	0	1	1	0

== Awards and honors ==
- 2008, All-Classic Suburban Conference
