= Tatyana Khlyzova =

Kazakhstani ice hockey player

Personal information
- Nationality: Kazakhstani
- Born: 10 March 1981 (age 45) Alma-Ata, Kazakh SSR, Soviet Union

Sport
- Sport: Ice hockey

Tatyana Khlyzova (Татьяна Васильевна Хлызова, born 10 March 1981) is a Kazakhstani ice hockey player. She competed in the women's tournament at the 2002 Winter Olympics.
