= Masako Sato (ice hockey) =

Japanese ice hockey player

Masako Sato 佐藤 雅子
- Born: June 9, 1973 (age 52) Tomakomai, Hokkaido, Japan
- Height: 5 ft 2 in (157 cm)
- Weight: 123 lb (56 kg; 8 st 11 lb)
- Position: Forward
- Shot: Right
- Played for: Laval Le Mistral
- National team: Japan
- Playing career: 1998–2005

Masako Sato (佐藤 雅子, Satō Masako; born June 9, 1973) is a Japanese retired ice hockey player and former member of the Japanese national ice hockey team. She represented Japan at the women's ice hockey tournament at the 1998 Winter Olympics. She also played three seasons with Laval Le Mistral a women's ice hockey team in the National Women's Hockey League. She was second in team scoring during the 1999–2000 NWHL season. Her sister Rie played only one season with Laval Le Mistral (1999–2000).

== Career statistics ==
Japan National Team

Event	GP	G	A	PTS	PIM	+/-	SOG
1998 Winter Olympics	5	1	0	1	6	-6	6

Laval Le Mistral (NWHL)

Event	GP	G	A	PTS	PIM	+/-	SOG
Season 1999-2000	34	13	12	25	10	n/a	n/a
Season 2000-01	n/a	n/a	n/a	n/a	n/a	n/a	n/a
Season 2001-2002	n/a	n/a	n/a	n/a	n/a	n/a	n/a
