= Hu Chunrong =

Chinese ice hockey player

Personal information
- Nationality: Chinese
- Born: 11 May 1979 (age 45)

Sport
- Sport: Ice hockey

Hu Chunrong (born 11 May 1979) is a Chinese ice hockey player. She competed in the women's tournament at the 2002 Winter Olympics.
