= Guo Hong =

Chinese ice hockey player

- Born: May 1, 1973 (age 52) Heilongjiang, China
- Height: 5 ft 8 in (173 cm)
- Weight: 146 lb (66 kg; 10 st 6 lb)
- Position: Goaltender
- Caught: Left
- National team: China
- Playing career: 1992–2002

Guo Hong (Chinese: 郭宏; pinyin: Guō Hóng), is a former goaltender for the China women's national ice hockey team. She was nicknamed The Great Wall of China for her talent in net, often making over 50 saves a game, and has been recognised as one of the best Chinese hockey players in history.

== Career ==
Hong represented the China women's national ice hockey team for over ten years. She led the team to 4th place finishes in the 1994 and 1997 IIHF Women's World Championships.

The 1996 Pacific Rim Tournament showcased one of the best games of her career. In a game against the Canadian National Women’s Team, Hong stopped 38 of 39 shots in a 1–0 loss.

At the 1998 Winter Olympics, she led the team to a 4th place finish, losing in the bronze medal game to Finland. At the 2002 Winter Olympics, she registered a save percentage of 0.8879. She led all goaltenders at the event in saves and shots against.

She retired in 2004 due to persistent back injuries.

== Career statistics ==
Year	Team	Event	Result	GP	W	L	T/OT	MIN	GA	SO	GAA	SV%
1992	China	WC	5th	5	-	-	-	-	-	-	3.48	0.872
1994	China	WC	4th	5	-	-	-	260:00	27	-	6.23	0.815
1998	China	OG	4th	6	2	3	0	349:29	16	0	2.75	0.893
2002	China	OG	7th	5	1	3	1	301:39	26	0	5.17	0.888
