= Natalya Trunova =

Kazakhstani ice hockey player

Personal information
- Nationality: Kazakhstani
- Born: 20 January 1982 (age 44) Alma-Ata, Kazakh SSR, Soviet Union

Sport
- Sport: Ice hockey

Natalya Trunova (Наталья Витальевна Трунова, born 20 January 1982) is a retired Kazakh ice hockey goaltender. She competed in the women's tournament at the 2002 Winter Olympics.

== Career statistics ==
Year	Team	Event	Result	GP	W	L	T/OT	MIN	GA	SO	GAA	SV%
2002	Kazakhstan	OG	8th	5	0	5	0	301:39	24	0	4.77	0.889
