= Marion Wohlrab =

German speed skater

Personal information
- Nationality: German
- Born: 8 June 1974 (age 50); Pfaffenhofen, West Germany

Sport
- Sport: Speed skating

Marion Wohlrab (born 8 June 1974) is a German speed skater. She competed in three events at the 2002 Winter Olympics.
