= Jana Schreckenbach =

German ice hockey player

Personal information
- Nationality: German
- Born: 8 July 1982 (age 42); Chemnitz, Germany

Sport
- Sport: Ice hockey

Jana Schreckenbach (born 8 July 1982) is a German ice hockey player. She competed in the women's tournament at the 2002 Winter Olympics.
