= Tammy Shewchuk-Dryden =

Canadian ice hockey player

- Born: December 31, 1977 (age 48) Saint-Laurent, Quebec, Canada
- Height: 5 ft 4 in (163 cm)
- Weight: 120 lb (54 kg; 8 st 8 lb)
- Position: Centre
- ECAC team: Harvard
- National team: Canada
- Playing career: 1994–2002
Medal record
Representing Canada
Women's ice hockey
Olympic Games
Gold medal – first place	2002 Salt Lake City	Tournament
IIHF World Women's Championships
Gold medal – first place	2000 Canada	Tournament
Gold medal – first place	2001 United States	Tournament

Tammy Lee "Barbie" Shewchuk (born December 31, 1977, in Saint-Laurent, Quebec) is a Canadian women's ice hockey player. Shewchuk was a member of the 2000 and 2001 gold medal teams at the Women's World Hockey Championships. She also competed at the 2002 Winter Olympics in Salt Lake City and contributed with two points (a goal and an assist) as Canada captured the gold medal. The Olympic gold medal was particularly special for Shewchuk as she was a late cut for the 1998 Olympic team.

== Playing career ==
=== Early years ===
Prior to the 2002 Olympics, Shewchuk was setting records. The New Year's Eve baby was the first female non-goaltender to play in the renowned Québec PeeWee tournament. The first boys team she competed with was the Lac St-Louis Lions in 1994 as a forward and the only female on the team. She also played for Team Quebec at the 1991 and 1995 Canada Winter Games. Shewchuk attended and played hockey for The Taft School and Harvard University.

=== Harvard Crimson ===
During the 2000–01 season, Shewchuk led the NCAA in assists per game with 1.48. At the time of her graduation from Harvard, Shewchuk was the NCAA’s all-time leading scorer. Shewchuk set records for goals (160), career assists (147), and career points (307). In 1998–99, Shewchuk was named a First-Team All-American and led Harvard to the College Hockey Championship. For her contributions, Shewchuk earned Harvard's John Dooley Award for combining sportsmanship, enthusiasm, and devotion to hockey.

== Personal life ==
She graduated from Harvard University with a degree in English literature. Tammy has since coached hockey at Lawrenceville School and Wesleyan University. She is married to Michael Dryden, son of hockey hall of famer Ken Dryden.

== Awards and honours ==
- United States College Hockey Online Offensive Player Of the Week (Week of November 24, 1998)
- Tammy Lee Shewchuk, 1999, 2000, 2001 ECAC All-Tournament team
- 1999 American Women's College Hockey Alliance All-Americans, First Team
- Top Three Finalist for 2001 Patty Kazmaier Award
- 2010 Inductee, Women's Beanpot Hall of Fame
