= Liu Hongmei =

Chinese ice hockey player

- Born: 27 December 1973 (age 52) Shandong, China
- Height: 162 cm (5 ft 4 in)
- Weight: 58 kg (128 lb; 9 st 2 lb)
- Position: Forward
- Shot: Right
- Played for: Harbin Ice Hockey
- National team: China
- Playing career: 1992–2002
Medal record
Asian Winter Games
| Gold medal – first place | 1999 Gangneung | Ice hockey |

Liu Hongmei
- Traditional Chinese: 劉紅梅
- Simplified Chinese: 刘红梅
Transcriptions
Standard Mandarin
- Hanyu Pinyin: Liú Hóngméi

Liu Hongmei (Chinese: 刘红梅; pinyin: Liú Hóngméi; born 27 December 1973) is a Chinese retired ice hockey player. She competed in the women's tournaments at the 1998 Winter Olympics and the 2002 Winter Olympics.

== Biography ==
Liu Hengmei was born on 27 December 1973 to a security guard and a maintenance worker for the city. Between 1992 and 2002, she represented the China women's national ice hockey team. Liu competed in the 1992 IIHF Women's World Championship. She played in five games at the 1994 IIHF Women's World Championship, where she tallied eight goals. Liu went to Winnipeg in 2001, where she learned how to converse in English. The Hockey News called her "the Chinese women's team's answer to Wayne Gretzky" and said she was a "player to watch" during the 2002 Winter Olympics.

During the Olympics, she competed for China in the forward position and was the team's captain. The shoulder of her uniform during the Olympics bore the Swoosh logo. She earned three goals for her team. During the game against the Germany team, she made two goals. In a game with the Kazakhstan team, she had an injured shoulder. With 1 minute 39 seconds left in overtime, Liu scored a close-range goal, giving her team a 2–1 win and seventh place. Liu said in an interview after the game, "I had very complicated feelings at the time. Originally, we could win without overtime. After scoring the goal, I thought we had finally won. Yes, it's really not easy." With three goals each, she and Yang Xiuqing were their team's highest scorers.

Liu and four other players retired from the national team after the 2002 Olympics, which "China Consumer Daily" said weakened the team's strength. During her over a decade tenure on the national team, Liu earned 44 points, completed 27 goals, and had 17 assists. Writing for Sina Corporation in 2015, Wang Xuefeng called Liu "a star player" who has been "highly praised by the international ice hockey community".

== Career statistics ==
Note: GP = Games played; G = Goals; A = Assists; Pts = Points; PIM = Penalty minutes;

| | | | | Regular season |
| Year | Team | Event | Result | GP | G | A | Pts | PIM |
|---|---|---|---|---|---|---|---|---|
| 1992 | China | WC | 5th | 5 | 2 | 1 | 3 | 6 |
| 1994 | China | WC | 4th | 5 | 8 | 3 | 11 | 2 |
| 1997 | China | WC | 4th | 5 | 3 | 3 | 6 | 2 |
| 1998 | China | OG | 4th | 6 | 2 | 3 | 5 | 4 |
| 1999 | China | WC | 5th | 5 | 3 | 4 | 7 | 2 |
| 2000 | China | WC | 6th | 5 | 5 | 1 | 6 | 4 |
| 2001 | China | WC | 6th | 5 | 2 | 1 | 3 | 0 |
| 2002 | China | OG | 7th | 5 | 3 | 1 | 4 | 4 |
