= Ice hockey at the 2002 Winter Olympics – Women's tournament =

2002 Winter Olympics

Tournament details
- Host country: United States
- Venues: 2 (in 2 host cities)
- Dates: 11–21 February
- Teams: 8

Final positions
- Champions: Canada (1st title)
- Runners-up: United States
- Third place: Sweden
- Fourth place: Finland

Tournament statistics
- Games played: 20
- Goals scored: 127 (6.35 per game)
- Attendance: 129,435 (6,472 per game)
- Scoring leader: (Canada) Hayley Wickenheiser (10 points)

Awards
- MVP: (Canada) Hayley Wickenheiser

The women's tournament in ice hockey at the 2002 Winter Olympics was held in Provo and West Valley City, United States, from 11 to 21 February. Eight teams competed, seeded into two groups. Canada won the gold medal game by a score of 3–2 over the United States, who were awarded silver.nThe bronze medal game was won by Sweden, who defeated Finland 2–1.

The tournament consisted of 20 games: 12 in the preliminary round (teams play the other teams in their own group); 4 final classification games; 2 semifinal games; 1 bronze medal game; and 1 final.

== Qualification ==
The qualification process, and seedings for the Olympic tournament, came from the final standings of the 2000 IIHF Women's World Championship. The top six nations were given direct entry to the Olympics, the final two spots were contested in a qualification tournament. The nations ranked seven through ten played a round robin in Engelberg, Switzerland from 8 to 11 February 2001.

Pos	Team	Pld	W	D	L	GF	GA	GD	Pts	Qualification
1	Kazakhstan	3	2	0	1	9	10	−1	4	2002 Winter Olympics
2	Germany	3	1	1	1	7	6	+1	3 (Note: Germany 3–1 Switzerland)	2002 Winter Olympics
3	Switzerland (H)	3	1	1	1	10	7	+3	3	
4	Japan	3	0	2	1	7	10	−3	2	

Source: IIHF
(H) Hosts
Notes:

All times are local (UTC+1).

8 February 2001; 16:30	Japan	3–3 (1–0, 0–2, 2–1)	Germany	Sporting Park, Engelberg; Attendance: 300

8 February 2001; 20:00	Kazakhstan	2–7 (0–3, 0–3, 2–1)	Switzerland	Sporting Park, Engelberg; Attendance: 825

9 February 2001; 17:00	Kazakhstan	5–2 (1–1, 2–0, 2–1)	Japan	Sporting Park, Engelberg; Attendance: 513

10 February 2001; 17:00	Germany	3–1 (0–1, 1–0, 2–0)	Switzerland	Sporting Park, Engelberg; Attendance: 800

11 February 2001; 13:30	Germany	1–2 (0–0, 0–1, 1–1)	Kazakhstan	Sporting Park, Engelberg; Attendance: 531

11 February 2001; 17:00	Switzerland	2–2 (0–0, 0–0, 2–2)	Japan	Sporting Park, Engelberg; Attendance: 920

== Rosters ==
Group A

- Canada (roster)
- Sweden (roster)
- Russia (roster)
- Kazakhstan (roster)

Group B

- United States (roster)
- Finland (roster)
- China (roster)
- Germany (roster)

== Preliminary round ==
All times are local (UTC–7).

=== Group A ===
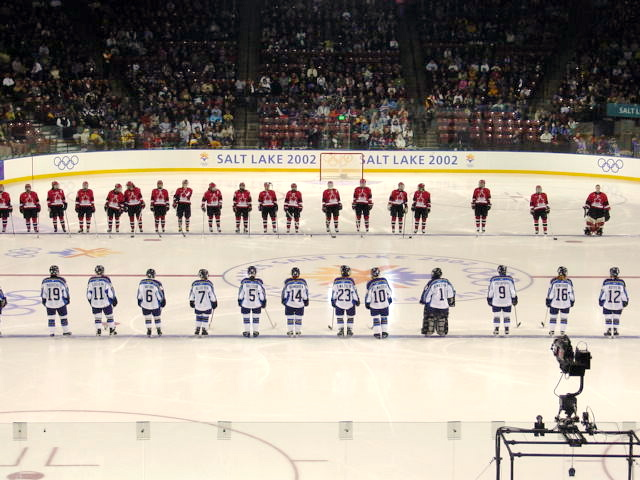
Canada vs Kazakhstan

Pos	Team	Pld	W	D	L	GF	GA	GD	Pts	Qualification
1	Canada	3	3	0	0	25	0	+25	6	Semifinals
2	Sweden	3	2	0	1	10	13	−3	4	Semifinals
3	Russia	3	1	0	2	6	11	−5	2	5–8th place semifinals
4	Kazakhstan	3	0	0	3	1	18	−17	0	5–8th place semifinals

Source: TSN

11 February 2002; 11:00	Canada	7–0 (3–0, 2–0, 2–0)	Kazakhstan	E Center, West Valley City; Attendance: 7,321

Kim St-Pierre
Goalies
Natalya Trunova
Referee:
(Finland) Anne Haanpää
Linesmen:
(Germany) Tina Kirschner
(Canada) Megan MacKenzie

Wickenheiser (PP) – 02:33	1–0
Piper (Antal, Sostorics) – 08:45	2–0
Sunohara (Piper, Ouellette) (PP) – 11:09	3–0
Shewchuk (Goyette, Sostorics) (PP) – 23:49	4–0
Wickenheiser (Goyette) (PP) – 35:18	5–0
Goyette (Wickenheiser) (PP) – 47:27	6–0
Sunohara (Hefford) – 57:23	7–0

8 min
Penalties
18 min
66
Shots
11

11 February 2002; 14:00	Sweden	3–2 (2–0, 1–2, 0–0)	Russia	Peaks Ice Arena, Provo; Attendance: 5,241

Annica Åhlén
Goalies
Irina Gashennikova
Referee:
(United States) Krista Knight
Linesmen:
(Canada) Julie Bissonnette
(Finland) Johanna Suban

Edstrand (Rooth, Holst) (PP) – 08:14	1–0
Almblad (Pettersson) – 15:15	2–0
Bergstrand – 24:11	3–0
	3–1	25:07 – Pashkevich
	3–2	36:04 – Mishina (Permyakova)

4 min
Penalties
10 min
44
Shots
14

13 February 2002; 11:00	Russia	0–7 (0–2, 0–2, 0–3)	Canada	E Center, West Valley City; Attendance: 8,213

Irina Gashennikova
Goalies
Sami Jo Small
Referee:
(Finland) Anu Hirvonen
Linesmen:
(Finland) Johanna Suban
(Canada) Megan MacKenzie

0–1	11:37 – Wickenheiser
0–2	18:00 – Goyette (Wickenheiser)
0–3	20:31 – Antal (Ouellette, Heaney)
0–4	29:14 – Piper (Ouellette, Botterill)
0–5	47:48 – Botterill (Sunohara, Brisson) (PP)
0–6	58:12 – Chartrand
0–7	58:50 – Goyette (Wickenheiser)

18 min
Penalties
4 min
6
Shots
60

13 February 2002; 14:00	Sweden	7–0 (3–0, 2–0, 2–0)	Kazakhstan	Peaks Ice Arena, Provo; Attendance: 3,549

Kim Martin
Goalies
Natalya Trunova
Referee:
(United States) Stacey Livingston
Linesmen:
(Canada) Sue Cassidy
(Switzerland) Sandra Lischetti

Holst – 01:08	1–0
Rooth (SH) – 02:38	2–0
Vikman (Lindberg) – 11:05	3–0
Almblad (Rooth, Holst) (PP) – 32:27	4–0
Holst (A. Andersson, Rooth) (PP) – 35:41	5–0
Bergstrand (Holst) (PP) – 44:05	6–0
G. Andersson – 54:46	7–0

22 min
Penalties
24 min
43
Shots
17

15 February 2002; 14:00	Kazakhstan	1–4 (1–1, 0–2, 0–1)	Russia	Peaks Ice Arena, Provo; Attendance: 5,618

Natalya Trunova
Goalies
Irina Gashennikova
Referee:
(United States) Stacey Livingston
Linesmen:
(Finland) Johanna Suban
(Netherlands) Ilse Robben

	0–1	04:43 – Pashkevich
Yakovchuk (Potapova, Vasina) (PP) – 10:36	1–1
	1–2	26:24 – Terentieva (Smolentseva)
	1–3	35:03 – Burina (Smolentseva, Trefilova)
	1–4	47:37 – Tsareva

16 min
Penalties
16 min
18
Shots
52

16 February 2002; 19:00	Canada	11–0 (1–0, 4–0, 6–0)	Sweden	Peaks Ice Arena, Provo; Attendance: 6,306

Kim St-Pierre
Goalies
Annica Åhlén
Referee:
(Finland) Anu Hirvonen
Linesmen:
(Russia) Marina Konstantinova
(Germany) Tina Kirschner

Botterill (Shewchuk, Bechard) – 10:26	1–0
Piper – 26:01	2–0
Botterill (Heaney, Hefford) (PP) – 29:12	3–0
Wickenheiser (Campbell, Goyette) – 32:06	4–0
Campbell (Goyette) – 37:18	5–0
Ouellette – 42:42	6–0
Hefford (Dupuis) – 43:05	7–0
Dupuis – 46:52	8–0
Sunohara (Hefford) – 55:21	9–0
Antal (Botterill, Brisson) (PP) – 59:37	10–0
Chartrand (Hefford, Ouellette) – 59:54	11–0

4 min
Penalties
22 min
70
Shots
22

=== Group B ===
Pos	Team	Pld	W	D	L	GF	GA	GD	Pts	Qualification
1	United States (H)	3	3	0	0	27	1	+26	6	Semifinals
2	Finland	3	2	0	1	7	6	+1	4	Semifinals
3	Germany	3	0	1	2	6	18	−12	1	5–8th place semifinals
4	China	3	0	1	2	6	21	−15	1	5–8th place semifinals

Source: TSN
(H) Hosts

12 February 2002; 11:00	United States	10–0 (2–0, 4–0, 4–0)	Germany	E Center, West Valley City; Attendance: 8,504

Sara DeCosta
Goalies
Stephanie Wartosch-Kürten
Esther Thyßen
Referee:
(Canada) Laura Vanderhorst
Linesmen:
(Slovakia) Henrieta Hujdušová
(Russia) Marina Konstantinova

Bye (Potter, Mounsey) – 06:16	1–0
Baker (Bailey, Bye) – 15:05	2–0
Darwitz (Granato) – 21:44	3–0
Darwitz (PP) – 27:10	4–0
Bailey (Baker, Looney) – 27:33	5–0
Bye (King, Potter) – 28:53	6–0
Wendell – 41:13	7–0
Granato (Bye, Mounsey) (PP) – 48:00	8–0
Chu – 53:42	9–0
Mleczko (Chu) – 55:09	10–0

4 min
Penalties
8 min
57
Shots
8

12 February 2002; 14:00	Finland	4–0 (0–0, 2–0, 2–0)	China	Peaks Ice Arena, Provo; Attendance: 4,977

Tuula Puputti
Goalies
Guo Hong
Referee:
(Canada) Jacqui Palm
Linesmen:
(United States) Julie Piacentini
(Netherlands) Ilse Robben

Rantamäki (Nieminen, Hänninen) (PP) – 30:37	1–0
Riipi (Nieminen) (SH) – 39:43	2–0
Laaksonen (Nieminen) – 55:05	3–0
Sirviö – 57:39	4–0

12 min
Penalties
12 min
54
Shots
12

14 February 2002; 11:00	Finland	3–1 (1–0, 2–0, 0–1)	Germany	Peaks Ice Arena, Provo; Attendance: 4,769

Tuula Puputti
Goalies
Stephanie Wartosch-Kürten
Referee:
(United States) Krista Knight
Linesmen:
(Slovakia) Henrieta Hujdušová
(United States) Julie Piacentini

Riipi (Hoikkala, Voutilainen) – 02:43	1–0
Parviainen (Riipi, Sirviö) – 27:55	2–0
Sikiö (Mertanen, Riipi) (PP) – 29:40	3–0
	3–1	53:55 – Wierscher (Frühwirt, Rückauer)

6 min
Penalties
16 min
39
Shots
16

14 February 2002; 16:00	China	1–12 (0–3, 1–5, 0–4)	United States	Peaks Ice Arena, Provo; Attendance: 6,325

Guo Hong
Goalies
Sarah Tueting
Referee:
(Canada) Laura Vanderhorst
Linesmen:
(Canada) Julie Bissonnette
(Canada) Sue Cassidy

	0–1	01:19 – Granato (Wendell, Darwitz)
	0–2	07:04 – Looney (Bailey, Baker)
	0–3	16:30 – Granato
	0–4	27:48 – King (Potter, Kennedy)
	0–5	29:22 – Baker (Wall)
	0–6	29:57 – Chu (Kennedy, Kilbourne)
	0–7	30:31 – King (Mleczko, Ruggiero)
Yang (Wang L.) – 36:01	1–7
	1–8	39:50 – Darwitz (Wendell)
	1–9	44:03 – Baker (King)
	1–10	44:33 – Granato (Chu)
	1–11	54:56 – Ruggiero (King, Potter)
	1–12	56:30 – Merz (Looney)

6 min
Penalties
29 min
10
Shots
71

16 February 2002; 11:00	United States	5–0 (3–0, 1–0, 1–0)	Finland	E Center, West Valley City; Attendance: 8,507

Sara DeCosta
Goalies
Tuula Puputti
Referee:
(Canada) Jacqui Palm
Linesmen:
(Canada) Sue Cassidy
(Canada) Julie Bissonnette

Darwitz (Mleczko, Granato) – 11:09	1–0
Darwitz (Ruggiero, DeCosta) (SH) – 15:19	2–0
Potter (Mounsey) (PP) – 18:13	3–0
Darwitz (Wendell) – 34:42	4–0
Kilbourne (Ruggiero) (PP) – 54:18	5–0

22 min
Penalties
26 min
47
Shots
21

16 February 2002; 14:00	Germany	5–5 (1–1, 1–4, 3–0)	China	Peaks Ice Arena, Provo; Attendance: 5,418

Esther Thyßen
Stephanie Wartosch-Kürten
Goalies
Guo Hong
Referee:
(Finland) Anne Haanpää
Linesmen:
(Switzerland) Sandra Lischetti
(United States) Julie Piacentini

Ritter (Valenti) – 01:37	1–0
	1–1	05:48 – Sun (Chen, Hu)
	1–2	24:55 – Ma (Jin, Yang)
	1–3	25:28 – Sun (Liu H.)
Lanzl (Rückauer) – 32:18	2–3
	2–4	34:06 – Liu H. (Sun)
	2–5	39:58 – Liu H. (Hu, Sun)
Becker (Ziegenhals, Wartosch-Kürten) – 43:36	3–5
Oswald (Linde, Wolf) (PP2) – 55:16	4–5
Lanzl (Oswald, Becker) – 58:19	5–5

4 min
Penalties
8 min
31
Shots
28

== Classification round ==
5–8th place semifinals
A3	Russia	4
B4	China	1
B3	Germany	4
A4	Kazakhstan	0

5th place game
A3	Russia	5
B3	Germany	0
7th place game
B4	China	2
A4	Kazakhstan	1

=== 5–8th place semifinals ===
17 February 2002; 14:00	Russia	4–1 (0–1, 3–0, 1–0)	China	Peaks Ice Arena, Provo; Attendance: 5,719

Irina Gashennikova
Goalies
Guo Hong
Referee:
(Canada) Laura Vanderhorst
Linesmen:
(Germany) Tina Kirschner
(Switzerland) Sandra Lischetti

	0–1	01:12 – Yang
Mishina (Byalkovskaya) – 22:07	1–1
Pashkevich (Schelchkova) (PP) – 24:29	2–1
Burina (Smolentseva, Trefilova) – 24:49	3–1
Tsareva (Pashkevich) (PP) – 52:05	4–1

14 min
Penalties
24 min
41
Shots
31

17 February 2002; 21:00	Germany	4–0 (1–0, 3–0, 0–0)	Kazakhstan	E Center, West Valley City; Attendance: 7,773

Stephanie Wartosch-Kürten
Goalies
Natalya Trunova
Referee:
(United States) Krista Knight
Linesmen:
(Russia) Marina Konstantinova
(United States) Megan MacKenzie

Lanzl (Oswald, Becker) – 15:27	1–0
Grundmann (Scheytt) – 22:21	2–0
Becker – 24:49	3–0
Becker (Ziegenhals, Lanzl) (PP) – 35:50	4–0

16 min
Penalties
10 min
21
Shots
26

=== Seventh place game ===
19 February 2002; 14:00	China	2–1 OT (1–0, 0–0, 0–1) (OT:1–0)	Kazakhstan	Peaks Ice Arena, Provo; Attendance: 5,490

Guo Hong
Goalies
Natalya Trunova
Referee:
(Finland) Anu Hirvonen
Linesmen:
(Russia) Marina Konstantinova
(Canada) Julie Bissonnette

Yang – 03:07	1–0
	1–1	57:46 – Losyeva (Sazonova)
Liu H. (Hu, Wang L.) – 61:39	2–1

16 min
Penalties
10 min
35
Shots
35

=== Fifth place game ===
19 February 2002; 19:00	Russia	5–0 (2–0, 1–0, 2–0)	Germany	Peaks Ice Arena, Provo; Attendance: 5,781

Irina Gashennikova
Goalies
Stephanie Wartosch-Kürten
Referee:
(Finland) Anne Haanpää
Linesmen:
(Canada) Sue Cassidy
(Netherlands) Ilse Robben

Burina (Pashkevich) – 03:24	1–0
Burina (Schelchkova, Bobrova) – 07:41	2–0
Tsareva (Bobrova, Schelchkova) (PP) – 33:31	3–0
Smolentseva – 40:51	4–0
Trefilova (PP) – 45:35	5–0

12 min
Penalties
12 min
42
Shots
25

== Knockout stage ==
=== Bracket ===
Semi-finals
19 February – West Valley City
United States	4
Sweden	0
19 February – West Valley City
Canada	7
Finland	3

Gold medal game
21 February – West Valley City
United States	2
Canada	3
Bronze medal game
21 February – Provo
Finland	1
Sweden	2

=== Semi-finals ===
19 February 2002; 11:05	Canada	7–3 (2–1, 0–2, 5–0)	Finland	E Center, West Valley City; Attendance: 7,289

Kim St-Pierre
Goalies
Tuula Puputti
Referee:
(United States) Stacey Livingston
Linesmen:
(Canada) Megan MacKenzie
(United States) Julie Piacentini

Brisson (PP) – 05:58	1–0
Wickenheiser (Chartrand) (SH) – 08:10	2–0
	2–1	19:35 – Reima (Fisk, Riipi)
	2–2	22:56 – Reima (Fisk, Hänninen)
	2–3	23:51 – Riipi (Reima, Fisk)
Wickenheiser (Goyette, St-Pierre) – 43:19	3–3
Hefford (Sunohara) – 43:25	4–3
Sunohara (Goyette) – 57:26	5–3
Campbell – 58:32	6–3
Brisson (Botterill) (PP) – 59:03	7–3

10 min
Penalties
14 min
54
Shots
18

19 February 2002; 16:30	United States	4–0 (2–0, 1–0, 1–0)	Sweden	E Center, West Valley City; Attendance: 7,738

Sarah Tueting
Goalies
Kim Martin
Referee:
(Canada) Jacqui Palm
Linesmen:
(Slovakia) Henrieta Hujdušová
(Finland) Johanna Suban

Granato (Mounsey, Wendell) – 17:16	1–0
King (Bye, Mleczko) – 19:32	2–0
Granato (Potter, Mounsey) (PP) – 28:57	3–0
Darwitz (Wendell, Granato) – 52:58	4–0

14 min
Penalties
12 min
32
Shots
10

=== Bronze medal game ===
21 February 2002; 12:10	Finland	1–2 (0–2, 1–0, 0–0)	Sweden	Peaks Ice Arena, Provo; Attendance: 6,298

Game reference

Tuula Puputti
Goalies
Kim Martin
Referee:
(Canada) Laura Vanderhorst
Linesmen:
(Canada) Sue Cassidy
(United States) Julie Piacentini

	0–1	05:08 − Samuelsson (G. Andersson)
	0–2	17:15 − Samuelsson (Bergstrand) (PP)
Sikiö (Laaksonen, Hänninen) − 31:35	1–2

8 min
Penalties
16 min
33
Shots
20

=== Gold medal game ===
21 February 2002; 17:10	United States	2–3 (0–1, 1–2, 1–0)	Canada	E Center, West Valley City; Attendance: 8,599

Game reference

Sara DeCosta
Goalies
Kim St-Pierre
Referee:
(United States) Stacey Livingston
Linesmen:
(Finland) Johanna Suban
(Slovakia) Henrieta Hujdušová

	0–1	01:45 − Ouellette (Piper)
King (Granato, Mounsey) (PP) − 21:59	1–1
	1–2	24:10 − Wickenheiser (Goyette)
	1–3	39:59 − Hefford (Kellar, Brisson)
Bye (Mounsey, Potter) (PP) − 56:27	2–3

12 min
Penalties
26 min
27
Shots
29

== Statistics ==
=== Scoring leaders ===
List shows the top ten skaters sorted by points, then goals.

Player	GP	G	A	Pts	+/−	PIM	POS
(Canada) Hayley Wickenheiser	5	7	3	10	+7	2	F
(United States) Cammi Granato	5	6	4	10	+9	0	F
(Canada) Danielle Goyette	5	3	7	10	+7	0	F
(United States) Natalie Darwitz	5	7	1	8	+8	2	F
(United States) Katie King	5	4	3	7	+6	4	F
(Canada) Jayna Hefford	5	3	4	7	+7	2	F
(United States) Jenny Potter	5	1	6	7	+6	2	F
(United States) Tara Mounsey	5	0	7	7	+5	4	D
(Canada) Vicky Sunohara	5	4	2	6	+7	6	F
(Canada) Jennifer Botterill	5	3	3	6	+2	8	F
(United States) Karyn Bye	5	3	3	6	+6	0	F
(Finland) Katja Riipi	5	3	3	6	+4	6	F

GP = Games played; G = Goals; A = Assists; Pts = Points; +/− = P Plus–minus; PIM = Penalties in minutes; POS = Position
Source: IIHF.com

=== Leading goaltenders ===
Only the top five goaltenders, based on save percentage, who have played at least 40% of their team's minutes, are included in this list.

Player	TOI	GA	GAA	SA	Sv%	SO
(United States) Sarah Tueting	120:00	1	0.50	20	95.00	1
(United States) Sara Decosta	179:00	3	1.01	58	94.83	2
(Sweden) Kim Martin	180:00	5	1.67	82	93.90	1
(Canada) Kim St-Pierre	240:00	5	1.25	78	93.59	2
(Russia) Irina Gashennikova	300:00	12	2.40	178	93.26	1

TOI = Time on ice (minutes:seconds); GA = Goals against; GAA = Goals against average; SA = Shots against; Sv% = Save percentage; SO = Shutouts

=== Final rankings ===
Rank	Team
1st place, gold medalist(s)	Canada
2nd place, silver medalist(s)	United States
3rd place, bronze medalist(s)	Sweden
4	Finland
5	Russia
6	Germany
7	China
8	Kazakhstan

== Awards ==
- Media All-Stars
  - Goaltender: (Canada) Kim St-Pierre
  - Defencemen: (United States) Tara Mounsey, (United States) Angela Ruggiero
  - Forwards: (United States) Natalie Darwitz, (United States) Cammi Granato, (Canada) Hayley Wickenheiser
- Most Valuable Player: (Canada) Hayley Wickenheiser
- Best players selected by the directorate:
  - Best Goaltender: (Canada) Kim St-Pierre
  - Best Defenceman: (United States) Angela Ruggiero
  - Best Forward: (Canada) Hayley Wickenheiser
