= Franziska Reindl =

German ice hockey player (born 1982)

Personal information
- Nationality: German
- Born: 16 September 1982 (age 43) Garmisch-Partenkirchen, Germany

Sport
- Sport: Ice hockey

Franziska Reindl (born 16 September 1982) is a German ice hockey player. She competed in the women's tournament at the 2002 Winter Olympics.
