= Michael Künzel =

German speed skater (born 1973)

Personal information
- Nationality: German
- Born: 24 May 1973 (age 51); Plauen, Germany

Sport
- Sport: Speed skating

Michael Künzel (born 24 May 1973) is a German former speed skater. He competed at the 1998 Winter Olympics and the 2002 Winter Olympics.
