= Isabelle Chartrand =

Canadian ice hockey player

- Born: April 20, 1978 (age 48) Anjou, Quebec, Canada
- Height: 5 ft 5 in (165 cm)
- Weight: 135 lb (61 kg; 9 st 9 lb)
- Position: Defence
- Shot: Left
- Played for: DEC Graz; EHV Sabres Vienna; HC Tornado; St. Lawrence Saints; Laval Le Mistral
- National team: Canada
- Playing career: 1995–2010
Medal record
Representing Canada
Women's ice hockey
Olympic Games
Gold medal – first place	2002 Salt Lake City	Tournament
World Championship
Gold medal – first place	2001 United States
Women's inline hockey
FIRS World Championship
Gold medal – first place	2002 United States

Isabelle Chartrand (born April 20, 1978) is a Canadian retired ice hockey defenceman. As a member of the Canadian national ice hockey team, she won Olympic gold at the 2002 Winter Olympics and a gold medal at the 2001 IIHF Women's World Championship.

== Playing career ==
Chartrand began playing ringette as a child, but eventually shifted to ice hockey. By the age of 16, she was a member of Team Quebec. At the 1995 Canada Winter Games, she claimed a bronze medal in ice hockey. Four years later, she won gold with Team Quebec at the Esso women's hockey nationals.

She played two seasons, 1998–99 and 1999–2000, with Laval Le Mistral of the National Women's Hockey League.

=== NCAA ===
Before the 2002 Olympics, Chartrand attended St. Lawrence University in Canton, New York. As a member of the St. Lawrence Saints women's ice hockey program in the ECAC Hockey conference, Chartrand was named Rookie of the Week on January 15, 2001.

She is one of only three athletes from St. Lawrence University to have an Olympic Gold Medal – the others are Ed Rimkus and Gina Kingsbury.

== International play ==
Chartrand competed at the 2002 Winter Olympics in Salt Lake City before her 24th birthday. Chartrand was one of the youngest members of the team. Chartrand had two goals and an assist for Team Canada's gold medal-winning team at the 2002 Winter Olympics.

Her previous experience with Team Canada was a gold medal at the 2001 IIHF Women's World Championship. Also a member of the Canada women's national inline hockey team, Chartrand won a gold medal at the 2002 FIRS Inline Hockey World Championships.
