= Peaks Ice Arena =

Indoor ice hockey and figure skating arena in Provo, Utah, United States

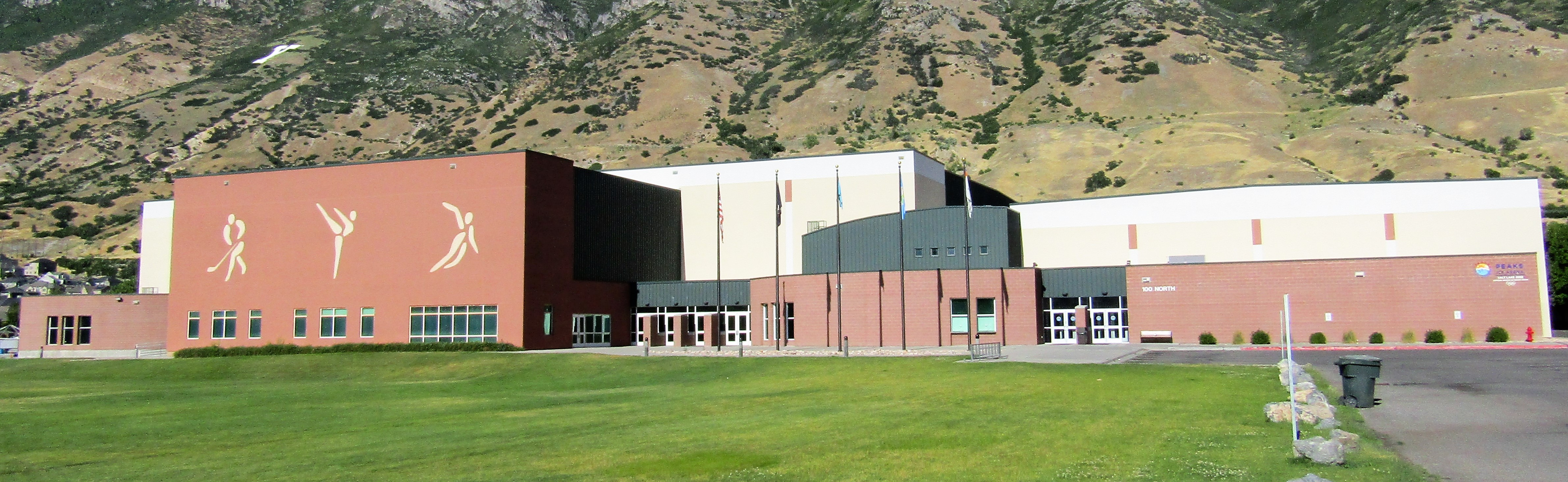
- Looking east at the Peaks Ice Arena, June 2017
- Interactive map of Peaks Ice Arena
- Location: 100 North; Seven Peaks Boulevard; Provo, Utah, United States
- Coordinates: 40°14′5″N 111°38′17″W
- Owner: Provo City/Utah County Ice Sheet Authority
- Capacity: 2,300

Construction
- Groundbreaking: September 17, 1997
- Built: 1997–1998
- Opened: November 20, 1998
- Cost: $12.4 million USD
- Architects: Valentiner, Crane, Brunjes, Onyon (VCBO) Architecture
- General contractors: Hogan and Associates

Tenants
- BYU Men's Ice Hockey (1999–2022); Peaks Youth Hockey Association (2000–present); XIX Olympic Winter Games (February 2002)

Website
- peaksarena.provo.org

Peaks Ice Arena is an indoor ice hockey and figure skating arena in Provo, Utah, located 43 miles (69 km) south of Salt Lake City. Along with the Maverik Center (originally known as the E Center) in West Valley City, it was built as an ice hockey and figure skating venue for the 2002 Winter Olympics, roles it is expected to reprise for the 2034 Winter Olympics. It currently serves as the home of the Utah Valley University men’s ice hockey team, Peaks Youth Hockey Association, several high school teams, the Peaks Figure Skating Club, and a Learn-to-Skate USA program for beginning skaters of all ages.

== History ==
Provo was chosen as the site for an Olympic venue because the leaders of Utah County refused to support Utah's 1989 Olympic referendum unless they were promised at least one Olympic event would be held in the county. Originally county leaders wanted a speed skating oval built somewhere in Provo or on the campus of Utah Valley University; others suggested the game's Closing Ceremony could be held at Brigham Young University's football stadium. After the 1989 Olympic referendum passed, and Salt Lake City lost its 1991 bid to host the 1998 Winter Olympics, the Utah Sports Authority and Provo City decided to wait until Salt Lake City bid again for the 2002 Winter Olympics before any venue planning would start.

After Salt Lake City won the 2002 Olympic bid in 1995, planning began again for what venue Utah County could host. It was decided that the city of Provo would host the venue, but that it would only be a practice ice sheet, mostly likely to be built in the planned Provo Towne Centre mall. Eventually plans changed and a larger, yet still only a practice ice facility, was planned to be constructed near Provo's East Bay Golf Course. Utah County, Provo, and SLOC all okayed the plans and committed to building the $7.7 million (equivalent to $15.81 million in 2025) facility. But in July 1996, before construction had started, the owners of Provo's Seven Peaks Waterpark approached the city and asked that the arena be built on the park's property, and Seven Peaks would pay for an additional ice sheet to be constructed in the same building. The plan was approved by county officials October 14, 1996, with Provo paying $2 million, Utah County $2 million, SLOC $3 million, and Seven Peaks donating land for the arena and parking spaces. Valentiner, Crane, Brunjes, Onyon Architecture was chosen to design the arena.

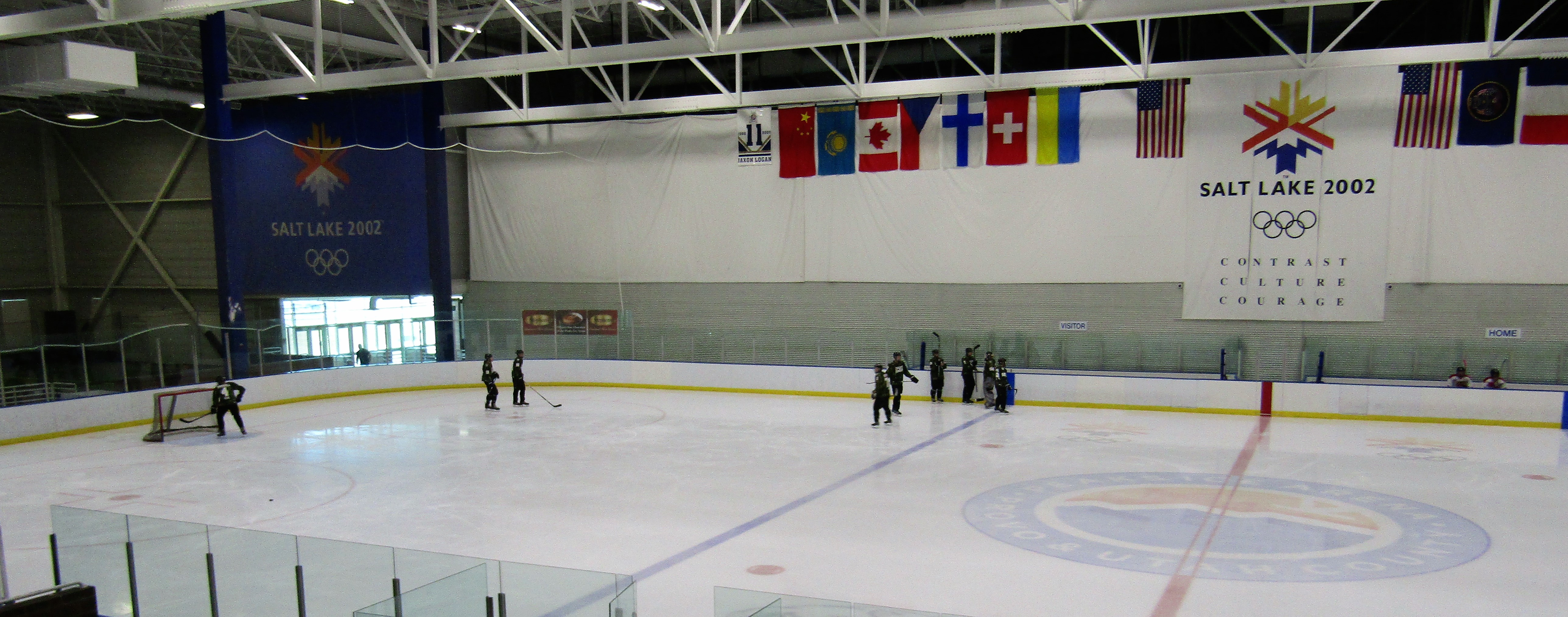
The additional ice sheet at the Peaks Ice Arena, June 2017

On September 17, 1997 ground was broken for construction next to Seven Peaks Waterpark. It was to be 84,000 square feet (7,800 m^{2}) in size, with two ice sheets side by side. One ice sheet would have seating for about 2,000 spectators while the other would seat 300. By the time ground was broken the price had increased to $8.5 million, $1.5 million more than originally planned; the extra cost would be paid for by Seven Peaks.

Soon after construction had begun SLOC decided to host competitive hockey events in the new arena, versus the original plan to use the arena for practices, and using Utah Valley University's UCCU Center (then known as the McKay Events Center) for the competitions. SLOC would contribute $5.25 million (equivalent to $10.529 million in 2025) towards the project, the cost of which had just jumped to $10.75 million, with the addition of 12 locker rooms instead of four, extra seating, and other minor additions to the original plan.

The arena opened November 20, 1998 in what was considered a "soft opening", and following the completion of minor work, the arena was supposed to have a grand opening in January or February 1999. But in December 1998 allegations of a scandal involving SLOC members, and members of the International Olympic Committee concerning the 2002 Olympic bid surfaced, pushing back the grand opening. As a result, the grand opening celebration was held September 29, 1999, and the venue hosted its first event, a hockey game between the University of Minnesota Duluth Bulldogs and the University of Calgary Oval Extremes, two days later. The completed arena cost $12.4 million to build, included two ice sheets, had seating for over 2,000 spectators, and was 110,000 square feet (10,000 m^{2}) in size.

On November 20, 2008, Provo City took control of the arena from Seven Peaks owner Max Rabner, resolving a lawsuit that had been on going for years over the original construction and management agreements. The arena is now operated by the Parks and Recreation Department of Provo.

== 2002 Winter Olympics ==
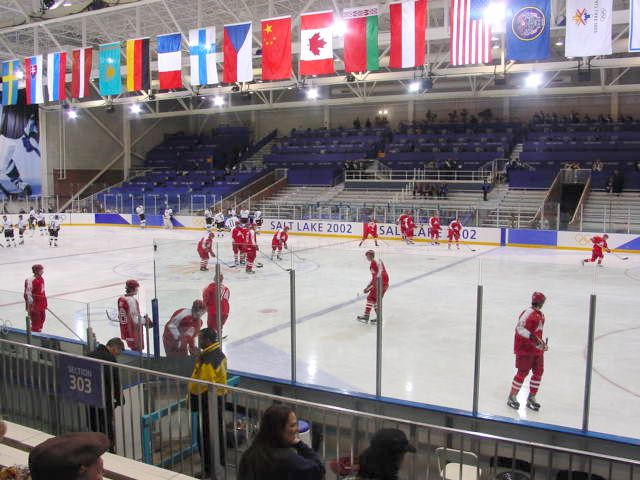
February 2002 Olympic ice hockey game between Austria and Latvia inside the arena

During the 2002 games both men's and women's ice hockey games and practices were held in the arena. Because of its original size over 6,000 temporary seats had to be installed to boost the ice center's capacity to 8,400, including press members. 93 percent of tickets were sold, for a total 131,067 of spectators witnessing events in the arena.

== The arena today ==
The arena is home to the Peaks Figure Skating Club. The arena formerly served as home ice for the Provo Predators of the United States Premier Hockey League (who relocated to Wyoming in 2024 in lieu of the arrival of Utah Hockey Club), and is the current home ice for the ACHA collegiate hockey team of Utah Valley University, and high school teams including Timpanogos, Utah County Independent, Lehi, Payson, Spanish Fork and Springville, as well as the Peaks Youth Hockey Association. The arena is open to the public for ice skating, skating lessons, and can even be used for indoor soccer games.
