= Andrea Kilbourne-Hill =

American ice hockey player

Personal information
- Born: April 19, 1980 (age 46) Saranac Lake, New York, U.S.
Medal record
Women's ice hockey
Representing United States
Olympic Games
Silver medal – second place	2002 Salt Lake City	Tournament
IIHF World Women's Championships
Silver medal – second place	2004 Canada	Tournament

Andrea Marie Kilbourne-Hill (born April 19, 1980) is an American ice hockey player. She won a silver medal at the 2002 Winter Olympics.

A native of Saranac Lake, New York, Kilbourne attended Northwood School in Lake Placid. She played ice hockey at the school until her graduation in 1998. She then attended Princeton University and graduated in 2003. She was a leading scorer on the Princeton Tigers women's ice hockey team, scoring a total of 76 goals and 94 assists. At the 2002 Olympics, Kilbourne scored one goal and one assist in the tournament, helping the United States team take the silver medal. She was also a member of the United States teams which took second place in both the 2004 4 Nations Cup and the 2004 Women's World Ice Hockey Championships.

She taught as an elementary teacher for some time at Saint Agnes Catholic School in Lake Placid, New York.

Kilbourne coached girls' ice hockey at Lake Placid High School for three years and then moved to her alma mater, Northwood School, beginning with the 2008–2009 season. In 2014, she led the team to its most wins in a single season in the program's history.

Kilbourne and her husband, Dan Hill, live in her hometown of Saranac Lake. she has one son and one daughter. Her son plays professional hockey.

== See also ==
- Princeton University Olympians
