= Julia Wierscher =

German ice hockey player

Personal information
- Nationality: German
- Born: 10 May 1971 (age 54); Hanover, Germany

Sport
- Sport: Ice hockey

Julia Wierscher (born 10 May 1971) is a German ice hockey player. She competed in the women's tournament at the 2002 Winter Olympics.
