= Sara DeCosta-Hayes =

American ice hockey player (born 1977)

- Born: May 13, 1977 (age 49) Warwick, Rhode Island, U.S.
- Height: 5 ft 10 in (178 cm)
- Weight: 140 lb (64 kg; 10 st 0 lb)
- Position: Goaltender
- Caught: Left
- Played for: Providence
- National team: United States
- Playing career: 1995–2002
Medal record
Representing United States
Women's ice hockey
Olympic Games
Gold medal – first place	1998 Nagano	Tournament
Silver medal – second place	2002 Salt Lake City	Tournament
IIHF World Women's Championships
Silver medal – second place	2000 Canada	Tournament
Silver medal – second place	2001 United States	Tournament

Sara Ann DeCosta-Hayes (born May 13, 1977) is a retired American ice hockey goaltender. She won a gold medal at the 1998 Winter Olympics, and a silver medal at the 2002 Winter Olympics.

== Biography ==
She is the daughter of Nancy and Frank DeCosta. She was born in and grew up in Warwick, Rhode Island, and is Jewish. She is an alumna of Toll Gate High School, where she played goalie on the boys' hockey team. DeCosta is married, and the couple has three children.

She attended Providence College ('00), where she was a hockey goalie, and allowed only 177 goals with 2,324 saves in 85 games. She graduated with a degree in social science, with concentrations in sociology and psychology.

She won a gold medal at the 1998 Winter Olympics (she had three wins, one a shutout, with a 1.59 goals-against average and a .875 save percentage) and a silver medal at the 2002 Winter Olympics, where she had the best goals-against average and save percentage.

She won a World Championship silver medal in 2000, had the best GAA (0.50) and the best SVS% (.975) at the 2001 World Championship where she again won a silver medal, and had the best GAA (1.00) and the best SVS% (.948) at the 2002 World Championship where she again won a silver medal.

DeCosta was USA Hockey Women's Player of the Year in 2000. In 2002–03, she was a volunteer coach for the women's hockey team at Providence. She was the goaltending coach for the Harvard Crimson women's ice hockey team in 2008–09.

DeCosta was named by Brandeis University, a contemporary Jewish sports heroine.

== Career statistics ==
Year	Team	Event	Result	GP	W	L	T/OT	MIN	GA	SO	GAA	SV%
1998	USA	OG	1st place, gold medalist(s)	3	3	0	0	150:36	4	1	1.59	0.875
2002	USA	OG	2nd place, silver medalist(s)	3	2	1	0	180:00	3	2	1.00	0.948

== Awards and honors ==
- 2000 and 2002 Bob Allen Women's Player of the Year Award
- 2004 - inducted into the Rhode Island Heritage Hall of Fame.
- 2018 - inducted into the Rhode Island Hockey Hall of Fame.

== See also ==
- List of select Jewish ice hockey players
