= Tara Mounsey =

American ice hockey player (born 1978)

- Born: March 12, 1978 (age 48) Concord, New Hampshire, USA
- Height: 5 ft 6 in (168 cm)
- Weight: 150 lb (68 kg; 10 st 10 lb)
- Position: Defense
- Played for: Brown Bears
- National team: United States
- Playing career: 1996–2002
Medal record
Women's ice hockey
Representing the United States
Olympic Games
Gold medal – first place	1998 Nagano	Team competition
Silver medal – second place	2002 Salt Lake City	Team competition
IIHF World Women's Championships
Silver medal – second place	1997 Canada	Team competition
Silver medal – second place	1999 Finland	Team competition

Tara Lynn Mounsey (born March 12, 1978) is an American ice hockey defenseman who played for the United States Women's Olympic Hockey Team, winning a gold medal at the 1998 Winter Olympics in Nagano, Japan and a silver medal at the 2002 Winter Olympics in Salt Lake City, Utah.

Mounsey played high school hockey at Concord High School in Concord, New Hampshire. Playing on the boys' team, she became the first female player to win the New Hampshire (Class L) Player of the Year award, after leading Concord to the 1996 state championship.

Mounsey went on to play for Brown University where she was a two-sports athlete, ice-hockey and field hockey.

In ice hockey, she immediately made an impact on the ice, earning Ivy League and ECAC Rookie of the Year honors. During the 1997–1998 season, Tara Mounsey took a hiatus from college hockey to focus on the Winter Olympics. At the Games, she collected two goals and four assists, which was tied for tops among defenders for Team USA. For her outstanding performance, she was also selected to the All-World Team. She and her teammates won the first ever Olympic gold medal in Women ice hockey defeating Canada 3–1. They are credited for growing the sport's popularity for future generations with enrollment rising from 28,000 girls playing at the time to 80,000 playing today.

Outside of the ice, Mounsey also found success on the turf. Playing just two seasons of field hockey, she is Brown's field hockey team's all-time leader in career points and goals and ranks eighth in assists. "She also holds the record for most points in a season, goals in a season, goals in a game and points in a game. Mounsey left Brown as the 13th all-time leading scorer and was honored as Brown’s co-best defensive player in 2000."

Today Mounsey, a graduate of Brown University with a graduate degree from Boston College, is a Nurse practitioner at New England Baptist Hospital, Massachusetts.

== Awards and honors ==
- 1996 NHIAA Player of the year
- Ivy rookie of the year (1996)
- ECAC rookie of the year (1996)
- First team All-Ivy league (1996, 1998, 2000)
- Regional All-American (2000)
- First Team All-American (2000)
- 1998 Olympic gold medalist
- Olympic ice hockey All World team (1998, 2002)
- 2002 Olympic silver medalist
- 2002 Olympic ice hockey most assists (W)
- 2002 Olympic ice hockey most points by a defenseman (W)
- 2009 U.S. Hockey Hall of Fame
- 2011 Brown Hall of Fame (ice hockey and field hockey)
- 2018 NHIAA Hall of Fame
- 2019 U.S. Olympic & Paralympic Hall of Fame
- 2025 US Hockey Hall of Fame
- Patty Kazmaier Award Finalist, 1999, 2000
