= Nina Linde =

German ice hockey player

- Born: 10 June 1980 (age 46) Munich, West Germany
- Height: 166 cm (5 ft 5 in)
- Weight: 58 kg (128 lb; 9 st 2 lb)
- Position: Defense
- Shoots: Right
- Played for: Ski IL; Ilves Tampere; Frankfurt Young Lions; TV Kornwestheim; MERC Wild Cats; ESC Planegg; ERSC Ottobrunn
- National team: Germany
- Playing career: 1998–present

Nina Linde (born 10 June 1980) is a German ice hockey player and former member of the German national ice hockey team. She represented Germany in the women's ice hockey tournament at the 2002 Winter Olympics and at the IIHF Women's World Championship in 1999, 2000, 2001, and 2005.
