= Sabine Rückauer =

German ice hockey player

Personal information
- Nationality: German
- Born: 13 April 1977 (age 47); Düsseldorf, Germany

Sport
- Sport: Ice hockey

Sabine Rückauer (born 13 April 1977) is a German ice hockey player. She competed in the women's tournament at the 2002 Winter Olympics.
