= Esther Thyssen =

German ice hockey player (born 1979)

Personal information
- Nationality: German
- Born: 31 July 1979 (age 46) Krefeld, Germany

Sport
- Sport: Ice hockey

Esther Thyssen (born 31 July 1979) is a German former ice hockey player. She competed in the women's tournament at the 2002 Winter Olympics.

== Career statistics ==
Year	Team	Event	Result	GP	W	L	T/OT	MIN	GA	SO	GAA	SV%
2002	Germany	OG	6th	2	0	0	0	71:07	9	0	7.59	0.816
