= Sandra Kinza =

German ice hockey player

Personal information
- Nationality: German
- Born: 1 August 1969 (age 55); Unna, Germany

Sport
- Sport: Ice hockey

Sandra Kinza (born 1 August 1969) is a German ice hockey player. She competed in the women's tournament at the 2002 Winter Olympics.
