= Stephanie Wartosch-Kürten =

German ice hockey player

Personal information
- Nationality: German
- Born: 12 November 1978 (age 47) Düsseldorf, Germany

Sport
- Sport: Ice hockey

Stephanie Wartosch-Kürten née Kürten (born 12 November 1978) is a retired German ice hockey goaltender. She competed in the women's tournaments at the 2002 Winter Olympics and the 2006 Winter Olympics.

== Career statistics ==
Year	Team	Event	Result	GP	W	L	T/OT	MIN	GA	SO	GAA	SV%
1994	Germany	WC	8th	4	-	-	-	240:00	30	-	7.50	0.840
2002	Germany	OG	6th	5	1	3	1	228:53	14	1	3.67	0.902
2006	Germany	OG	5th	2	1	1	0	120:00	5	0	2.50	0.875
