= Nina Ziegenhals =

German ice hockey player

Personal information
- Nationality: German
- Born: 23 May 1982 (age 42); Bonn, Germany

Sport
- Sport: Ice hockey

Nina Ziegenhals (born 23 May 1982) is a German ice hockey player. She competed in the women's tournament at the 2002 Winter Olympics.
