= Steffi Frühwirt =

German ice hockey player

Personal information
- Nationality: German
- Born: 22 July 1980 (age 44); Wolfratshausen, Germany

Sport
- Sport: Ice hockey

Steffi Frühwirt (born 22 July 1980) is a German ice hockey player. She competed in the women's tournaments at the 2002 Winter Olympics and the 2006 Winter Olympics.
