= Maren Valenti =

German ice hockey player

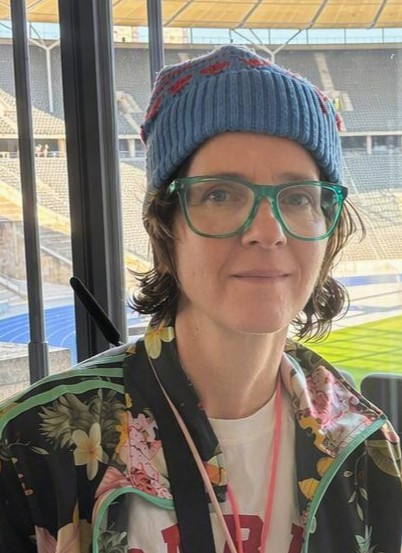

Personal information
- Nationality: German
- Born: 15 October 1976 (age 49) Freiburg im Breisgau, Germany

Sport
- Sport: Ice hockey

Maren Valenti (born 15 October 1976) is a German ice hockey player. She competed in the women's tournament at the 2002 Winter Olympics.
