= Anja Scheytt =

German ice hockey player

Personal information
- Nationality: German
- Born: 5 December 1980 (age 44); Mannheim, Germany

Sport
- Sport: Ice hockey

Anja Scheytt (born 5 December 1980) is a German ice hockey player. She competed in the women's tournaments at the 2002 Winter Olympics and the 2006 Winter Olympics.
