= Chris Bailey (ice hockey) =

American ice hockey player (born 1972)

- Born: February 5, 1972 (age 54) Marietta, NY, USA
- Height: 5 ft 6 in (168 cm)
- Weight: 160 lb (73 kg; 11 st 6 lb)
- Position: Defense
- HEA team: Providence
- National team: United States
- Playing career: 1990–2002
Medal record
Women's ice hockey
Representing United States
Olympic Games
Gold medal – first place	1998 Nagano	Tournament
Silver medal – second place	2002 Salt Lake City	Ice hockey
IIHF World Women's Championships
Silver medal – second place	1994 United States	Tournament
Silver medal – second place	1997 Canada	Tournament
Silver medal – second place	1999 Finland	Tournament
Silver medal – second place	2000 Canada	Tournament
Silver medal – second place	2001 United States	Tournament

Christina Bailey (born February 5, 1972) is an American ice hockey player. She won a gold medal at the 1998 Winter Olympics and a silver medal at the 2002 Winter Olympics. Bailey finished her career with the Providence Friars with 27 goals, 49 assists, and 76 points.
