= Biathlon at the 2006 Winter Olympics – Women's sprint =

Women's biathlon sprint at the XX Olympic Winter Games
- Pictogram for biathlon
- Venue: Cesana San Sicario
- Dates: February 16, 2006
- Competitors: 84 from 28 nations
- Winning time: 22:31.4

Medalists
1st place, gold medalist(s)		Florence Baverel-Robert	France
2nd place, silver medalist(s)		Anna Carin Olofsson	Sweden
3rd place, bronze medalist(s)		Lilia Efremova	Ukraine

The Women's 7.5 kilometre sprint biathlon competition at the 2006 Winter Olympics in Turin, Italy was held on 16 February, at Cesana San Sicario. Competitors raced over three loops of a 2.5 kilometre skiing course, shooting ten times, five prone and five standing. Each miss required a competitor to ski a 150-metre penalty loop.

Uschi Disl was the defending World Champion at the sprint, while Kati Wilhelm won the sprint at the trial event in 2005, despite shooting two penalty laps. Wilhelm was also the defending Olympic champion, and entered the games leading the sprint World Cup ahead of Disl and Russian Svetlana Ishmouratova.

== Results ==
Rank	Name	Country	Time	Penalties	Deficit
1st place, gold medalist(s)	Florence Baverel-Robert	France	22:31.4	0	—
2nd place, silver medalist(s)	Anna Carin Olofsson	Sweden	22:33.8	1	+0:02.4
3rd place, bronze medalist(s)	Lilia Efremova	Ukraine	22:38.0	0	+0:06.6
4	Albina Akhatova	Russia	22:40.2	0	+0:08.8
5	Olena Zubrilova	Belarus	22:40.5	0	+0:09.1
6	Sandrine Bailly	France	22:43.0	2	+0:11.6
7	Kati Wilhelm	Germany	22:49.8	1	+0:18.4
8	Olga Nazarova	Belarus	22:53.2	0	+0:21.8
9	Olga Zaytseva	Russia	23:05.8	0	+0:34.4
10	Svetlana Ishmouratova	Russia	23:10.3	1	+0:38.9
11	Liu Xianying	China	23:17.5	1	+0:46.1
12	Liv Grete Poirée	Norway	23:20.0	2	+0:48.6
13	Michela Ponza	Italy	23:27.2	1	+0:55.8
14	Delphyne Peretto	France	23:31.2	0	+0:59.8
14	Teja Gregorin	Slovenia	23:31.2	0	+0:59.8
16	Martina Halinarova	Slovakia	23:32.8	0	+1:01.4
17	Martina Glagow	Germany	23:35.9	1	+1:04.5
18	Diana Rasimovičiūtė	Lithuania	23:48.1	1	+1:16.7
19	Linda Tjorhom	Norway	23:48.5	1	+1:17.1
20	Magdalena Gwizdon	Poland	23:54.7	1	+1:23.3
21	Sun Ribo	China	23:57.6	2	+1:26.2
22	Katrin Apel	Germany	24:04.9	2	+1:33.5
23	Tora Berger	Norway	24:05.8	1	+1:34.4
24	Kong Yingchao	China	24:07.0	1	+1:35.6
25	Krystyna Pałka	Poland	24:07.3	1	+1:35.9
26	Nathalie Santer	Italy	24:09.5	2	+1:38.1
27	Sona Mihokova	Slovakia	24:09.9	1	+1:38.5
28	Madara Liduma	Latvia	24:11.0	2	+1:39.6
29	Marcela Pavkovcekova	Slovakia	24:11.1	0	+1:39.7
30	Sylvie Becaert	France	24:12.9	0	+1:41.5
31	Tadeja Brankovič	Slovenia	24:14.1	2	+1:42.7
32	Lenka Faltusová	Czech Republic	24:16.9	0	+1:45.5
33	Ekaterina Dafovska	Bulgaria	24:23.2	2	+1:51.8
34	Uschi Disl	Germany	24:29.1	3	+1:57.7
35	Rachel Steer	United States	24:29.6	1	+1:58.2
36	Irina Nikoultchina	Bulgaria	24:30.0	4	+1:58.6
37	Ekaterina Ivanova	Belarus	24:30.8	4	+1:59.4
38	Anna Murinova	Slovakia	24:32.1	1	+2:00.7
39	Kateřina Holubcová	Czech Republic	24:33.3	1	+2:01.9
40	Gro Marit Istad Kristiansen	Norway	24:34.0	1	+2:02.6
41	Natalia Levtchenkova	Moldova	24:34.2	1	+2:02.8
42	Ludmilla Ananko	Belarus	24:36.1	1	+2:04.7
43	Zdeňka Vejnarová	Czech Republic	24:46.4	2	+2:15.0
44	Olena Petrova	Ukraine	24:52.2	2	+2:20.8
45	Alexandra Rusu	Romania	24:52.5	0	+2:21.1
46	Pavlina Filipova	Bulgaria	24:53.3	2	+2:21.9
47	Eveli Saue	Estonia	24:55.4	1	+2:24.0
48	Dana Elena Plotogea	Romania	25:01.7	1	+2:30.3
49	Oksana Khvostenko	Ukraine	25:10.1	1	+2:38.7
50	Nina Lemesh	Ukraine	25:13.5	2	+2:42.1
51	Ikuyo Tsukidate	Japan	25:17.0	1	+2:45.6
52	Anna Lebedeva	Kazakhstan	25:21.8	2	+2:50.4
53	Katja Haller	Italy	25:22.6	1	+2:51.2
54	Hou Yuxia	China	25:25.8	5	+2:54.4
55	Dijana Grudiček	Slovenia	25:28.6	3	+2:57.2
56	Magdalena Nykiel	Poland	25:32.2	1	+3:00.8
57	Saskia Santer	Italy	25:42.6	3	+3:11.2
58	Radka Popova	Bulgaria	26:01.1	2	+3:29.7
59	Andreja Mali	Slovenia	26:02.5	3	+3:31.1
60	Anzela Brice	Latvia	26:03.1	3	+3:31.7
61	Magda Rezlerová	Czech Republic	26:06.7	2	+3:35.3
62	Zina Kocher	Canada	26:11.1	4	+3:39.7
63	Katarzyna Ponikwia	Poland	26:17.3	1	+3:45.9
64	Kanae Meguro	Japan	26:19.9	4	+3:48.5
65	Tamami Tanaka	Japan	26:20.6	5	+3:49.2
66	Sandra Keith	Canada	26:20.7	3	+3:49.3
67	Emma Fowler	Great Britain	26:22.9	1	+3:51.5
68	Elena Gorohova	Moldova	26:23.9	2	+3:52.5
69	Tomomi Otaka	Japan	26:28.7	3	+3:57.3
70	Éva Tófalvi	Romania	26:38.3	4	+4:06.9
71	Tracey Barnes	United States	26:47.9	2	+4:16.5
72	Linda Savlaka	Latvia	26:54.6	1	+4:23.2
73	Martine Albert	Canada	27:04.4	2	+4:33.0
74	Gerda Krumina	Latvia	27:30.5	3	+4:59.1
75	Sarah Konrad	United States	27:30.6	8	+4:59.2
76	Marie Pierre Parent	Canada	27:31.1	2	+4:59.7
77	Mihaela Purdea	Romania	27:32.7	4	+5:01.3
78	Aleksandra Vasiljević	Bosnia and Herzegovina	28:10.9	1	+5:39.5
79	Petra Starčević	Croatia	28:11.9	2	+5:40.5
80	Carolyn Treacy	United States	28:18.7	4	+5:47.3
81	Valentina Ciurina	Moldova	30:04.2	4	+7:32.8
82	Zsofia Gottschall	Hungary	31:09.1	6	+8:37.7
83	Veronica Isbej	Chile	33:52.0	4	+11:20.6
—	Olga Pyleva	Russia	Did not start		
