= Biathlon at the 2006 Winter Olympics – Women's individual =

Women's biathlon individual at the XX Olympic Winter Games
- Venue: Cesana San Sicario
- Dates: 13 February 2006
- Competitors: 82 from 28 nations
- Winning time: 49:24.1

Medalists
1st place, gold medalist(s)		Svetlana Ishmouratova	Russia
2nd place, silver medalist(s)		Martina Glagow	Germany
3rd place, bronze medalist(s)		Albina Akhatova	Russia

The Women's 15 kilometre individual biathlon competition at the 2006 Winter Olympics in Turin, Italy was held on 13 February, at Cesana San Sicario. Competitors raced over five loops of a 3.0 kilometre skiing course, shooting twenty times, ten prone and ten standing. Each miss resulted in one minute being added to a competitor's skiing time.

Anna Bogaliy-Titovets won at this track at the pre-Olympic trial event in 2005, when she finished in a time of 50:47.9 with one penalty minute, while Andrea Henkel was the defending World and Olympic champion. Henkel had not won a 15 km World Cup race apart from these two wins in the Championships, however, and Sweden's Anna Carin Olofsson was the World Cup leader before the Games.

Russia's Olga Pyleva originally placed second in the race, but was found to be in violation of anti-doping rules when she tested positive for carphedon, and she was then disqualified.

== Results ==
The race was held at 12:00.

Rank	Bib	Name	Country	Result	Penalties	Deficit
1st place, gold medalist(s)	15	Svetlana Ishmouratova	Russia	49:24.1	1 (0+0+1+0)	–
2nd place, silver medalist(s)	32	Martina Glagow	Germany	50:34.9	2 (0+1+0+1)	+1:10.8
3rd place, bronze medalist(s)	26	Albina Akhatova	Russia	50:55.0	2 (1+0+0+1)	+1:30.9
4	10	Andrea Henkel	Germany	51:46.3	2 (0+0+0+2)	+2:22.2
5	35	Krystyna Pałka	Poland	51:50.7	0 (0+0+0+0)	+2:26.6
6	38	Sandrine Bailly	France	51:58.2	3 (1+1+0+1)	+2:34.1
7	13	Olga Nazarova	Belarus	51:59.6	2 (2+0+0+0)	+2:35.5
8	31	Natalia Levchenkova	Moldova	52:11.7	2 (0+2+0+0)	+2:47.6
9	27	Liv Grete Poirée	Norway	52:22.0	3 (0+0+0+3)	+2:57.9
10	5	Madara Līduma	Latvia	52:27.2	4 (1+1+1+1)	+3:03.1
11	47	Ekaterina Dafovska	Bulgaria	52:45.1	3 (0+1+1+1)	+3:21.0
12	18	Uschi Disl	Germany	52:49.7	5 (0+2+0+3)	+3:25.6
13	40	Tora Berger	Norway	52:53.4	2 (1+1+0+0)	+3:29.3
14	9	Olena Zubrilova	Belarus	52:55.6	1 (0+0+0+1)	+3:31.5
15	42	Anna Carin Olofsson	Sweden	52:55.8	5 (1+3+0+1)	+3:31.7
16	6	Kati Wilhelm	Germany	52:59.0	5 (0+0+3+2)	+3:34.9
17	12	Michela Ponza	Italy	53:01.4	2 (0+0+1+1)	+3:37.3
18	39	Teja Gregorin	Slovenia	53:03.7	3 (0+2+0+1)	+3:39.6
19	24	Éva Tófalvi	Romania	53:04.3	2 (0+1+0+1)	+3:40.2
20	34	Oksana Khvostenko	Ukraine	53:22.5	1 (0+0+0+1)	+3:58.4
21	77	Andreja Mali	Slovenia	53:46.0	1 (1+0+0+0)	+4:21.9
22	25	Marcela Pavkovčeková	Slovakia	53:52.8	3 (0+0+1+2)	+4:28.7
23	3	Liu Xianying	China	53:55.6	5 (1+3+0+1)	+4:31.5
24	8	Sylvie Becaert	France	53:59.0	2 (0+1+1+0)	+4:34.9
25	51	Kong Yingchao	China	54:03.5	3 (0+1+1+1)	+4:39.4
26	36	Florence Baverel-Robert	France	54:14.1	5 (4+0+1+0)	+4:50.0
27	46	Zina Kocher	Canada	54:18.8	3 (0+2+0+1)	+4:54.7
28	57	Irina Nikoultchina	Bulgaria	54:29.3	6 (1+2+2+1)	+5:05.2
29	37	Olena Petrova	Ukraine	54:35.6	3 (0+2+0+1)	+5:11.5
30	63	Dijana Grudiček	Slovenia	55:01.3	4 (0+1+1+2)	+5:37.2
31	60	Yin Qiao	China	55:06.2	4 (2+1+0+1)	+5:42.1
32	54	Tamami Tanaka	Japan	55:10.5	4 (2+0+1+1)	+5:46.4
33	7	Magdalena Gwizdon	Poland	55:17.5	4 (1+1+1+1)	+5:53.4
34	49	Martina Halinárová	Slovakia	55:17.7	4 (2+1+0+1)	+5:53.6
35	28	Anna Bogaliy	Russia	55:18.4	5 (0+2+1+2)	+5:54.3
36	58	Lilia Efremova	Ukraine	55:28.0	5 (2+2+0+1)	+6:03.9
37	30	Kanae Meguro	Japan	55:28.4	5 (0+3+1+1)	+6:04.3
38	76	Barbara Ertl	Italy	55:30.0	2 (1+0+0+1)	+6:05.9
39	22	Tadeja Brankovič	Slovenia	55:38.9	6 (0+2+1+3)	+6:14.8
40	69	Delphyne Peretto	France	55:40.5	3 (1+1+1+0)	+6:16.4
41	53	Rachel Steer	United States	55:48.3	3 (1+1+1+0)	+6:24.2
42	29	Sandra Keith	Canada	55:56.3	2 (1+0+0+1)	+6:32.2
43	21	Pavlina Filipova	Bulgaria	56:07.7	5 (1+0+1+3)	+6:43.6
44	50	Ekaterina Ivanova	Belarus	56:09.7	6 (3+0+2+1)	+6:45.6
45	48	Kateřina Holubcová	Czech Republic	56:17.9	4 (0+0+3+1)	+6:53.8
46	80	Valj Semerenko	Ukraine	56:22.6	3 (0+1+1+1)	+6:58.5
47	67	Soňa Mihoková	Slovakia	56:29.5	5 (1+0+3+1)	+7:05.4
48	61	Anzela Brice	Latvia	56:30.5	2 (0+0+0+2)	+7:06.4
49	19	Anna Lebedeva	Kazakhstan	56:46.5	4 (1+1+1+1)	+7:22.4
50	17	Linda Tjørhom	Norway	56:47.8	6 (2+2+0+2)	+7:23.7
51	43	Saskia Santer	Italy	56:52.1	6 (1+2+1+2)	+7:28.0
52	62	Nathalie Santer	Italy	57:08.4	6 (0+2+1+3)	+7:44.3
53	20	Zdeňka Vejnarová	Czech Republic	57:14.3	6 (4+1+1+0)	+7:50.2
54	78	Nina Kadeva	Bulgaria	57:15.0	5 (2+1+0+2)	+7:50.9
55	66	Ikuyo Tsukidate	Japan	57:20.4	4 (1+2+0+1)	+7:56.3
56	79	Katarzyna Ponikwia	Poland	57:32.7	4 (2+1+1+0)	+8:08.6
57	2	Tracey Barnes	United States	57:58.0	1 (1+0+0+0)	+8:33.9
58	23	Hou Yuxia	China	58:35.7	9 (1+2+2+4)	+9:11.6
59	75	Jana Gereková	Slovakia	58:37.2	5 (1+2+1+1)	+9:13.1
60	11	Gunn Margit Andreassen	Norway	59:04.3	6 (0+0+1+5)	+9:40.2
61	65	Magda Rezlerová	Czech Republic	59:18.0	6 (1+2+3+0)	+9:53.9
62	64	Sarah Konrad	United States	59:33.1	10 (2+2+4+2)	+10:09.0
63	41	Linda Savļaka	Latvia	59:44.3	3 (3+0+0+0)	+10:20.2
64	73	Lanny Barnes	United States	59:46.2	4 (1+2+0+1)	+10:22.1
65	56	Martine Albert	Canada	59:52.1	5 (2+0+0+3)	+10:28.0
66	1	Diana Rasimovičiūtė	Lithuania	1:00:04.4	8 (3+2+1+2)	+10:40.3
67	71	Irena Česneková	Czech Republic	1:00:08.0	7 (3+0+2+2)	+10:43.9
68	70	Alexandra Rusu	Romania	1:00:13.7	5 (1+3+0+1)	+10:49.6
69	82	Tomomi Otaka	Japan	1:00:22.2	6 (1+2+2+1)	+10:58.1
70	72	Gerda Krumina	Latvia	1:00:26.1	4 (0+1+1+2)	+11:02.0
71	68	Magdalena Grzywa	Poland	1:00:41.3	7 (2+0+3+2)	+11:17.2
72	45	Dana Elena Plotogea	Romania	1:00:45.5	7 (2+1+2+2)	+11:21.4
73	14	Eveli Saue	Estonia	1:00:53.6	5 (3+1+0+1)	+11:29.5
74	4	Aleksandra Vasiljević	Bosnia and Herzegovina	1:01:11.8	1 (1+0+0+0)	+11:47.7
75	81	Mihaela Purdea	Romania	1:02:11.5	7 (3+2+2+0)	+12:47.4
76	59	Kseniya Zikunkova	Belarus	1:02:17.5	8 (1+2+2+3)	+12:53.4
77	74	Marie-Pierre Parent	Canada	1:02:57.1	4 (0+3+0+1)	+13:33.0
78	52	Emma Fowler	Great Britain	1:03:38.9	7 (0+3+1+3)	+14:14.8
79	16	Petra Starčević	Croatia	1:06:49.6	8 (4+1+1+2)	+17:25.5
80	33	Zsofia Gottschall	Hungary	1:08:17.3	8 (1+3+1+3)	+18:53.2
81	55	Verónica Isbej	Chile	1:14:55.3	7 (2+2+1+2)	+25:31.2
DSQ	44	Olga Pyleva	Russia	50:09.6	1 (1+0+0+0)	+45.5
