= Ski jumping at the 2006 Winter Olympics – Large hill team =

Men's large hill team at the XX Olympic Winter Games
- Pictogram for ski jumping
- Venue: Pragelato
- Dates: February 20, 2006
- Competitors: 64 from 16 nations
- Winning score: 984.0

Medalists
1st place, gold medalist(s)		Austria; Andreas Widholzl, Andreas Kofler, Martin Koch, Thomas Morgenstern
2nd place, silver medalist(s)		Finland; Tami Kiuru, Janne Happonen, Janne Ahonen, Matti Hautamäki
3rd place, bronze medalist(s)		Norway; Lars Bystøl, Bjørn Einar Romøren, Tommy Ingebrigtsen, Roar Ljøkelsøey

The men's large hill team ski jumping competition for the 2006 Winter Olympics was held in Pragelato, Italy. It occurred on 20 February.

== Results ==
Rank	Athlete	Run 1	Rank	Run 2	Rank	
Gold medal	Austria; Andreas Widholzl; Andreas Kofler; Martin Koch; Thomas Morgenstern	472.6; 107.1; 133.8; 106.6; 125.1	1	511.4; 122.7; 126.0; 120.3; 142.4	1	984.0; 229.8; 259.8; 226.9; 267.5
Silver medal	Finland; Tami Kiuru; Janne Happonen; Janne Ahonen; Matti Hautamäki	467.2; 113.6; 109.5; 122.2; 121.9	2	509.4; 127.2; 112.2; 129.6; 140.4	2	976.6; 240.8; 221.7; 251.8; 262.3
Bronze medal	Norway; Lars Bystøl; Bjørn Einar Romøren; Tommy Ingebrigtsen; Roar Ljøkelsøey	452.4; 117.3; 114.6; 97.2; 123.3	3	497.7; 136.9; 116.3; 97.2; 147.3	3	950.1; 254.2; 230.9; 194.4; 270.6
4	Germany; Michael Neumayer; Martin Schmitt; Michael Uhrmann; Georg Späth	446.0; 113.8; 116.4; 105.4; 110.4	4	476.6; 118.0; 100.9; 125.0; 132.7	4	922.6; 231.8; 217.3; 230.4; 243.1
5	Poland; Stefan Hula; Kamil Stoch; Robert Mateja; Adam Małysz	445.2; 99.9; 108.1; 116.3; 120.9	5	449.2; 101.2; 112.6; 110.8; 124.6	7	894.4; 201.1; 220.7; 227.1; 245.5
6	Japan; Daiki Ito; Tsuyoshi Ichinohe; Noriaki Kasai; Takanobu Okabe	426.8; 106.2; 104.3; 110.5; 105.8	6	466.3; 107.2; 103.1; 126.4; 129.6	5	893.1; 213.4; 207.4; 236.9; 235.4
7	Switzerland; Michael Möllinger; Simon Ammann; Guido Landert; Andreas Küttel	424.2; 107.2; 108.5; 95.7; 112.8	8	462.7; 108.7; 107.6; 108.6; 137.8	6	886.9; 215.9; 216.1; 204.3; 250.6
8	Russia; Denis Kornilov; Dimitri Ipatov; Dimitri Vassiliev; Ildar Fatchullin	425.0; 106.7; 105.3; 114.0; 99.0	7	431.8; 97.5; 109.9; 126.3; 98.1	8	856.8; 204.2; 215.2; 240.3; 197.1
9	Czech Republic; Jan Matura; Ondřej Vaculík; Borek Sedlák; Jakub Janda	397.0; 110.8; 79.6; 99.0; 107.6	9	did not advance		397.0; 110.8; 79.6; 99.0; 107.6
10	Slovenia; Rok Benkovič; Robert Kranjec; Primož Peterka; Jernej Damjan	390.4; 95.3; 74.4; 108.5; 112.2	10	did not advance		390.4; 95.3; 74.4; 108.5; 112.2
11	Italy; Andrea Morassi; Sebastian Colloredo; Alessio Bolognani; Davide Bresadola	328.4; 80.1; 105.3; 70.7; 72.3	11	did not advance		328.4; 80.1; 105.3; 70.7; 72.3
12	Kazakhstan; Nikolay Karpenko; Radik Zhaparov; Alexey Korolev; Ivan Karaulov	322.2; 84.8; 85.7; 69.7; 82.0	12	did not advance		322.2; 84.8; 85.7; 69.7; 82.0
13	South Korea; Choi Yong-Jik; Choi Heung-Chul; Kim Hyun-Ki; Kang Chil Ku	321.5; 79.0; 69.8; 89.8; 82.9	13	did not advance		321.5; 79.0; 69.8; 89.8; 82.9
14	United States; Tommy Schwall; Anders Johnson; Clint Jones; Alan Alborn	286.8; 60.7; 50.3; 82.2; 93.6	14	did not advance		286.8; 60.7; 50.3; 82.2; 93.6
15	Canada; Gregory Baxter; Stefan Read; Graeme Gorham; Michael Nell	276.8; 71.2; 82.0; 60.2; 63.4	15	did not advance		276.8; 71.2; 82.0; 60.2; 63.4
16	China; Li Yang; Yang Guang; Wang Jianxun; Tian Zhandong	206.1; 72.0; 32.5; 50.1; 51.5	16	did not advance		206.1; 72.0; 32.5; 50.1; 51.5
