= Ski jumping at the 2006 Winter Olympics – Normal hill individual =

Men's normal hill individual at the XX Olympic Winter Games
- Pictogram for ski jumping
- Venue: Pragelato
- Dates: February 11–12, 2006
- Competitors: 69 from 21 nations
- winning score: 266.5

Medalists
1st place, gold medalist(s)		Lars Bystøl; Norway
2nd place, silver medalist(s)		Matti Hautamäki; Finland
3rd place, bronze medalist(s)		Roar Ljøkelsøy; Norway

The men's normal hill individual ski jumping competition for the 2006 Winter Olympics was held in Pragelato, Italy. It began on 11 February, and concluded on 12 February.

Lars Bystøl of Norway won his country's first gold and his second international victory of the season, beating Matti Hautamäki to the title by only one point.

Dmitry Vassiliev could have won Russia's second ski jumping gold medal ever because he had the best jump in the first round. But as the last starter in the second round, he failed and finished tenth

This was the last highly ranked official event participated by Masahiko Harada - who won 2 Olympic medals in Nagano and 1 in Lillehammer - and it was after a break of over 3 years from participating in Ski jumping World Cup. Unfortunately for him, he was disqualified in the qualifying and did not compete in the final. Later he started only in FIS Cup event in Sapporo.

== Results ==
=== Qualifying ===
Fifteen skiers were pre-qualified, on the basis of their World Cup performance, meaning that they directly advanced to the final round. These skiers still jumped in the qualifying round, but they were not included with non-pre-qualified skiers in the standings. The fifty-four skiers who were not pre-qualified competed for thirty-five spots in the final round.

Rank	Name	Country	Score	Notes
1	Noriaki Kasai	Japan	132.5	
2	Dmitry Ipatov	Russia	129.0	
3	Dmitry Vassiliev	Russia	128.5	
4	Michael Neumayer	Germany	127.0	
4	Michael Möllinger	Switzerland	127.0	
4	Robert Mateja	Poland	127.0	
7	Alexander Herr	Germany	125.5	
8	Tami Kiuru	Finland	125.0	
9	Daiki Ito	Japan	123.0	
9	Martin Koch	Austria	123.0	
11	Kamil Stoch	Poland	122.5	
12	Borek Sedlák	Czech Republic	120.0	
13	Ildar Fatchullin	Russia	119.0	
14	Sebastian Colloredo	Italy	118.0	
15	Jens Salumae	Estonia	117.5	
16	Primož Peterka	Slovenia	117.0	
16	Denis Kornilov	Russia	117.0	
16	Alan Alborn	United States	117.0	
19	Guido Landert	Switzerland	116.0	
20	Jan Matura	Czech Republic	115.5	
21	Jernej Damjan	Slovenia	114.5	
21	Stefan Read	Canada	114.5	
23	Janne Happonen	Finland	114.0	
24	Stefan Hula	Poland	110.5	
25	Radik Zhaparov	Kazakhstan	110.0	
26	Ivan Karaulov	Kazakhstan	109.0	
26	Li Yang	China	109.0	
28	Rok Benkovič	Slovenia	108.0	
28	Maksim Anisimov	Belarus	108.0	
30	Andrea Morassi	Italy	107.5	
30	Kim Hyun-Ki	South Korea	107.5	
32	Jaan Jüris	Estonia	107.0	
33	Simon Ammann	Switzerland	106.0	
33	Jan Mazoch	Czech Republic	106.0	
35	Clint Jones	United States	104.5	
36	Choi Heung-Chul	South Korea	104.0	
36	Choi Yong-Jik	South Korea	104.0	
38	Tommy Schwall	United States	103.0	
39	Tian Zhongdan	China	102.0	
40	Alessio Bolognani	Italy	100.5	
41	Gregory Baxter	Canada	100.0	
42	Martin Mesik	Slovakia	97.5	
42	Graeme Gorham	Canada	97.5	
44	Kang Chil Ku	South Korea	96.5	
45	Petr Chaadaev	Belarus	95.5	
46	Jim Denney	United States	91.5	
47	Volodymyr Boschuk	Ukraine	88.5	
48	Alexey Korolev	Kazakhstan	86.5	
49	Petar Fartunov	Bulgaria	85.0	
50	Michael Nell	Canada	83.5	
51	Georgi Zharkov	Bulgaria	77.5	
*	Andreas Kuettel	Switzerland	134.5	
*	Andreas Kofler	Austria	134.5	
*	Janne Ahonen	Finland	133.5	
*	Adam Małysz	Poland	130.5	
*	Matti Hautamäki	Finland	130.0	
*	Andreas Widhölzl	Austria	129.0	
*	Takanobu Okabe	Japan	127.5	
*	Georg Späth	Germany	123.5	
*	Jakub Janda	Czech Republic	121.5	
*	Roar Ljøkelsøy	Norway	120.5	
*	Michael Uhrmann	Germany	120.5	
*	Bjørn Einar Romøren	Norway	118.0	
*	Thomas Morgenstern	Austria	117.0	
*	Robert Kranjec	Slovenia	102.0	
*	Lars Bystøl	Norway	DSQ	
DQ	Masahiko Harada	Japan	DSQ	
DQ	Nikolay Karpenko	Kazakhstan	DSQ	
DQ	Sigurd Pettersen	Norway	DSQ	

1: These skiers were pre-qualified; they did perform jumps in the qualification round, but were not ranked with the non-pre-qualified jumpers.

2: Lars Bystøl was disqualified because his suit had improper air permeability, but he still competed in the final because he was prequalified.

3: Masahiko Harada was disqualified due to the improper length of his skis (they were too long).

4: Nikolay Karpenko was disqualified for irregular suit.

5: Sigurd Pettersen was disqualified because his suit had improper air permeability, but on the contrary to Lars Bystøl he did not compete in the final.

=== Final ===
The final consisted of two jumps, with the top thirty after the first jump qualifying for the second jump. The combined total of the two jumps was used to determine the final ranking.

Rank	Name	Country	Jump 1	Rank	Jump 2	Rank	Total
Gold medal	Lars Bystøl	Norway	131.0	6	135.5	2	266.5
Silver medal	Matti Hautamäki	Finland	131.0	6	134.5	3	265.5
Bronze medal	Roar Ljøkelsøy	Norway	132.0	5	132.5	4	264.5
4	Michael Uhrmann	Germany	128.0	10	136.0	1	264.0
5	Andreas Küttel	Switzerland	133.5	4	129.0	8	262.5
6	Janne Ahonen	Finland	134.5	2	127.0	9	261.5
7	Adam Małysz	Poland	130.0	8	131.0	5	261.0
8	Michael Neumayer	Germany	129.5	9	131.0	5	260.5
9	Thomas Morgenstern	Austria	134.5	2	125.0	12	259.5
10	Dmitry Vassiliev	Russia	135.0	1	123.5	13	258.5
11	Andreas Kofler	Austria	127.0	11	130.5	7	257.5
12	Georg Späth	Germany	124.5	17	126.5	10	251.0
13	Jakub Janda	Czech Republic	123.5	18	125.5	11	249.0
13	Michael Möllinger	Switzerland	126.5	12	122.5	15	249.0
15	Bjørn Einar Romøren	Norway	125.5	15	122.5	15	248.0
16	Kamil Stoch	Poland	125.5	15	121.5	17	247.0
17	Andreas Widhölzl	Austria	120.5	20	123.5	13	244.0
18	Daiki Ito	Japan	126.0	13	117.5	19	243.5
19	Dmitry Ipatov	Russia	121.5	19	121.0	18	242.5
20	Noriaki Kasai	Japan	126.0	13	115.0	20	241.0
21	Alexander Herr	Germany	119.0	22	112.0	23	231.0
21	Jan Matura	Czech Republic	120.0	21	111.0	27	231.0
23	Takanobu Okabe	Japan	118.0	24	111.5	25	229.5
23	Martin Koch	Austria	118.0	24	111.5	25	229.5
25	Robert Mateja	Poland	115.0	28	114.0	21	229.0
26	Radik Zhaparov	Kazakhstan	115.0	28	112.0	23	227.0
27	Sebastian Colloredo	Italy	113.5	30	113.0	22	226.5
28	Janne Happonen	Finland	116.0	26	109.0	28	225.0
29	Stefan Hula	Poland	115.5	27	102.5	29	218.0
30	Primož Peterka	Slovenia	118.5	23	96.5	30	215.0
31	Tami Kiuru	Finland	113.0	31	—	—	
32	Jens Salumäe	Estonia	112.0	32	—	—	
33	Maksim Anisimov	Belarus	110.5	33	—	—	
34	Denis Kornilov	Russia	110.0	34	—	—	
35	Jernej Damjan	Slovenia	109.0	35	—	—	
36	Jan Mazoch	Czech Republic	108.5	36	—	—	
36	Andrea Morassi	Italy	108.5	36	—	—	
38	Simon Ammann	Switzerland	107.0	38	—	—	
38	Borek Sedlák	Czech Republic	107.0	38	—	—	
40	Alan Alborn	United States	106.5	40	—	—	
41	Robert Kranjec	Slovenia	105.5	41	—	—	
42	Stefan Read	Canada	105.0	42	—	—	
43	Kim Hyun-Ki	South Korea	104.5	43	—	—	
44	Ildar Fatchullin	Russia	102.5	44	—	—	
44	Li Yang	China	102.5	45	—	—	
46	Ivan Karaulov	Kazakhstan	102.0	46	—	—	
47	Clint Jones	United States	97.5	47	—	—	
48	Guido Landert	Switzerland	97.0	48	—	—	
49	Rok Benkovič	Slovenia	91.5	49	—	—	
50	Jaan Jüris	Estonia	88.5	50	—	—	
