= Canada at the 2006 Winter Olympics =

- IOC code: CAN
- NOC: Canadian Olympic Committee
- Website: www.olympic.ca (in English and French)

in Turin
- Competitors: 196 in 15 sports
- Flag bearers: Danielle Goyette (opening); Cindy Klassen (closing)
- Medals Ranked 5th: Gold 7 Silver 10 Bronze 7 Total 24

Winter Olympics appearances (overview)
- 1924; 1928; 1932; 1936; 1948; 1952; 1956; 1960; 1964; 1968; 1972; 1976; 1980; 1984; 1988; 1992; 1994; 1998; 2002; 2006; 2010; 2014; 2018; 2022; 2026

Canada competed at the 2006 Winter Olympics in Turin, Italy, with a team of 196 athletes and 220 support staff.

As host of the upcoming 2010 Winter Olympics, Canada was pressured to do well at the 2006 Games. The Canadian Olympic Committee's goal for 2006 was to have a top three finish in the medal count or 25 total medals, as a start to reach their goal of having the highest medal count at the 2010 Winter Olympics in Vancouver, British Columbia. Canada had managed to increase its medal count at each Winter Olympics since the 1980 Winter Olympics in Lake Placid, New York, United States. World Cup results from the 2005–06 season seemed to indicate that Canada would have a good performance in Turin, Italy. Canada met one of those goals and nearly met the other by finishing third behind the United States and Germany with 24 medals. The Games were also the first litmus test for the increased athletic funding and resources pursued by the Own the Podium 2010 program.

Another task for the Canadian contingent was to promote the 2010 Games, Vancouver and surrounding region, the province of British Columbia, as well as Canada as a nation. This was evident in the Canadian participation in the closing ceremonies of the Games and the establishment of the Canada House in Turin. The Games also provided opportunities for organizing committees to gather experience and strategies to run the Games in Vancouver.

== Medalists ==
Canada's total medal count of 24 was the highest ever won by the nation in any Winter Olympics, and was the second highest total for the country at any Olympic games (summer or winter), exceeded only by the 44 medals won at the 1984 Summer Olympics which were boycotted by the Soviet Union and other Eastern Bloc countries. Not only did Canada increase its total medal count from the previous Winter Games for the 7th straight time (since 1980), but the total medal count was also the "best ever" for Canada for the 5th straight time (since 1992).

Canada won at least one medal in 10 of the 15 sport disciplines competed at the games, and gold medals in 6 different disciplines; both feats were unmatched by any other nation. Canada also had the most 4th and 5th-place finishes (14 and 9 respectively) of any country in these games. These results support the effectiveness of the Own the Podium 2010 program.

Cindy Klassen bested the total Olympic medals collected in a single Games by a Canadian, with 5, and bested the total Olympic medal count of any Canadian (Winter and Summer) with 6. The previous record of 3 medals at a single Olympics was held by Gaetan Boucher for the 1984 Winter Olympics and Marc Gagnon at the 2002 Winter Olympics. Meanwhile, Clara Hughes tied the old mark of 5 career Olympic medals, held by Marc Gagnon and Phil Edwards. Sixteen of the 24 medals were won by female athletes. At age 50, Russ Howard became the oldest Canadian gold medalist in Olympic history.

Medal	Name	Sport	Event	Date
Gold	Jennifer Heil	Freestyle skiing	Women's moguls	February 11
Gold	Duff Gibson	Skeleton	Men's	February 17
Gold	Women's ice hockey team: Meghan Agosta; Gillian Apps; Jennifer Botterill; Cassie Campbell; Gillian Ferrari; Danielle Goyette; Jayna Hefford; Becky Kellar; Gina Kingsbury; Charline Labonté; Carla MacLeod; Caroline Ouellette; Cherie Piper; Cheryl Pounder; Colleen Sostorics; Kim St-Pierre; Vicky Sunohara; Sarah Vaillancourt; Katie Weatherston; Hayley Wickenheiser	Ice hockey	Women's	February 20
Gold	Cindy Klassen	Speed skating	Women's 1500 m	February 22
Gold	Chandra Crawford	Cross-country skiing	Women's sprint	February 22
Gold	Brad Gushue; Jamie Korab; Russ Howard; Mark Nichols; Mike Adam	Curling	Men's	February 24
Gold	Clara Hughes	Speed skating	Women's 5000 m	February 25
Silver	Sara Renner; Beckie Scott	Cross-country skiing	Women's team sprint	February 14
Silver	Arne Dankers; Steven Elm, Denny Morrison; Jason Parker; Justin Warsylewicz	Speed skating	Men's team pursuit	February 16
Silver	Kristina Groves; Clara Hughes; Cindy Klassen; Christine Nesbitt; Shannon Rempel	Speed skating	Women's team pursuit	February 16
Silver	Jeff Pain	Skeleton	Men's	February 17
Silver	Cindy Klassen	Speed skating	Women's 1000 m	February 19
Silver	Pierre Lueders; Lascelles Brown	Bobsleigh	Two-man	February 19
Silver	Alanna Kraus; Anouk Leblanc-Boucher; Amanda Overland; Kalyna Roberge; Tania Vicent	Short track speed skating	Women's 3000 m relay	February 22
Silver	Kristina Groves	Speed skating	Women's 1500 m	February 22
Silver	François-Louis Tremblay	Short track speed skating	Men's 500 m	February 25
Silver	Eric Bedard; Jonathan Guilmette; Charles Hamelin; François-Louis Tremblay; Mathieu Turcotte	Short track speed skating	Men's 5000 m relay	February 25
Bronze	Cindy Klassen	Speed skating	Women's 3000 m	February 12
Bronze	Anouk Leblanc-Boucher	Short track speed skating	Women's 500 m	February 15
Bronze	Jeffrey Buttle	Figure skating	Men's singles	February 16
Bronze	Mellisa Hollingsworth-Richards	Skeleton	Women's	February 16
Bronze	Dominique Maltais	Snowboarding	Women's snowboard cross	February 17
Bronze	Shannon Kleibrink; Amy Nixon; Glenys Bakker; Christine Keshen; Sandra Jenkins	Curling	Women's	February 23
Bronze	Cindy Klassen	Speed skating	Women's 5000 m	February 25

Medals by sport
Sport	gold	silver	bronze	Total
Speed skating	2	4	2	8
Skeleton	1	1	1	3
Cross-country skiing	1	1	0	2
Curling	1	0	1	2
Freestyle skiing	1	0	0	1
Ice hockey	1	0	0	1
Short track speed skating	0	3	1	4
Bobsleigh	0	1	0	1
Figure skating	0	0	1	1
Snowboarding	0	0	1	1
Total	7	10	7	24

== Alpine skiing ==
Men

Athlete	Event	Final				
Athlete	Event	Run 1	Run 2	Run 3	Total	Rank
Patrick Biggs	Slalom	54.38	Did not finish			
François Bourque	Super-G	n/a			1:31.27	8
François Bourque	Giant slalom	1:16.61	1:19.31	n/a	2:35.92	4
François Bourque	Combined	1:40.50	47.52	46.23	3:14.25	21
Thomas Grandi	Giant slalom	1:17.23	1:19.65	n/a	2:36.88	10
Thomas Grandi	Slalom	53.64	51.20	n/a	1:44.84	9
Erik Guay	Super-G	n/a			1:31.08	4
Michael Janyk	Slalom	55.32	50.87	n/a	1:46.19	17
John Kucera	Downhill	n/a			1:51.55	27
John Kucera	Super-G	n/a			1:32.10	22
John Kucera	Combined	1:41.04	46.67	45.55	3:13.26	17
Manuel Osborne-Paradis	Downhill	n/a			1:50.45	13
Manuel Osborne-Paradis	Super-G	n/a			1:32.02	20
Manuel Osborne-Paradis	Combined	1:39.69	50.11	Did not start		
Jean-Philippe Roy	Giant slalom	1:17.36	Did not finish			
Jean-Philippe Roy	Slalom	Did not finish				
Ryan Semple	Giant slalom	Did not finish				
Ryan Semple	Combined	1:41.65	Did not finish			

Women

Athlete	Event	Final				
Athlete	Event	Run 1	Run 2	Run 3	Total	Rank
Brigitte Acton	Giant slalom	1:02.07	1:09.64	n/a	2:11.71	11
Brigitte Acton	Slalom	44.75	47.15	n/a	1:31.90	17
Brigitte Acton	Combined	40.18	44.59	1:30.98	2:55.75	10
Emily Brydon	Downhill	n/a			1:58.97	20
Emily Brydon	Super-G	n/a			1:33.50	9
Emily Brydon	Combined	40.94	45.65	1:29.92	2:56.51	13
Sherry Lawrence	Downhill	n/a			2:00.47	27
Sherry Lawrence	Super-G	n/a			1:35.47	34
Christina Lustenberger	Giant slalom	Did not finish				
Shona Rubens	Downhill	n/a			2:00.30	26
Shona Rubens	Combined	Did not finish				
Genevieve Simard	Super-G	n/a			1:34.38	20
Genevieve Simard	Giant slalom	1:01.47	1:09.26	n/a	2:10.73	5
Kelly Vanderbeek	Downhill	n/a			1:59.63	24
Kelly Vanderbeek	Super-G	n/a			1:33.09	4

Note: In the men's combined, run 1 is the downhill, and runs 2 and 3 are the slalom. In the women's combined, run 1 and 2 are the slalom, and run 3 the downhill.

== Biathlon ==
Athlete	Event	Final		
Athlete	Event	Time	Misses	Rank
Martine Albert	Women's sprint	27:04.4	2	73
Martine Albert	Women's individual	59:52.1	5	65
Robin Clegg	Men's sprint	29:12.4	3	51
Robin Clegg	Men's pursuit	40:30.33	7	44
Robin Clegg	Men's individual	59:21.5	2	36
Sandra Keith	Women's sprint	26:20.7	3	66
Sandra Keith	Women's individual	55:56.3	2	42
Zina Kocher	Women's sprint	26:11.1	4	62
Zina Kocher	Women's individual	54:18.8	3	27
Jean-Philippe Leguellec	Men's sprint	29:32.3	2	60
Jean-Philippe Leguellec	Men's individual	1:00:28.0	3	48
David Leoni	Men's sprint	28:50.4	1	42
David Leoni	Men's pursuit	41:07.41	6	47
David Leoni	Men's individual	1:02:37.8	6	65
Marie-Pierre Parent	Women's sprint	27:31.1	2	76
Marie-Pierre Parent	Women's individual	1:02:57.1	4	77
Zina Kocher; Sandra Keith; Martine Albert; Marie-Pierre Parent	Women's relay	1:26:09.7	11	17

== Bobsleigh ==
Athlete	Event	Final					
Athlete	Event	Run 1	Run 2	Run 3	Run 4	Total	Rank
Serge Despres; David Bissett	Two-man	56.13	55.92	56.69	56.93	3:45.67	11
Pierre Lueders; Lascelles Brown	Two-man	55.57	55.50	56.11	56.41	3:43.59	Silver medal
Suzanne Gavine-Hlady; Jamie Cruickshank	Two-woman	58.49	57.86	58.65	58.82	3:53.82	13
Helen Upperton; Heather Moyse	Two-woman	57.37	57.77	58.09	57.83	3:51.06	4
Serge Despres; Nathan Cunningham; Steve Larsen; David Bissett	Four-man	56.10	56.15	55.69	55.58	3:43.52	18
Pierre Lueders; Ken Kotyk; Morgan Alexander; Lascelles Brown	Four-man	55.34	55.43	54.95	55.20	3:40.92	4

== Cross-country skiing ==
Sean Crooks was suspended for 5 days by the International Ski Federation for having excessive hemoglobin levels. He was able to participate in the men's sprint and 4× 10 km relay.

Distance

Athlete	Event	Final	
Athlete	Event	Total	Rank
Amanda Ammar	Women's 10 km classical	31:51.7	54
Chandra Crawford	Women's 15 km pursuit	50:35.4	60
Drew Goldsack	Men's 15 km classical	42:09.3	53
Drew Goldsack	Men's 30 km pursuit	1:24:14.3	56
George Grey	Men's 15 km classical	40:43.9	31
George Grey	Men's 30 km pursuit	1:19:08.9	25
George Grey	Men's 50 km freestyle	2:09:38.4	44
Chris Jeffries	Men's 30 km pursuit	1:26:17.0	61
Chris Jeffries	Men's 50 km freestyle	2:13:49.5	58
Devon Kershaw	Men's 15 km classical	41:42.7	47
Sara Renner	Women's 10 km classical	28:33.0	8
Sara Renner	Women's 15 km pursuit	44:30.9	16
Dan Roycroft	Men's 15 km classical	42:39.7	58
Dan Roycroft	Men's 30 km pursuit	1:20:53.3	39
Dan Roycroft	Men's 50 km freestyle	2:13:47.5	57
Beckie Scott	Women's 10 km classical	Disqualified	
Beckie Scott	Women's 15 km pursuit	43:20.6	6
Milaine Theriault	Women's 10 km classical	31:30.4	46
Milaine Theriault	Women's 15 km pursuit	48:38.9	54
Milaine Theriault	Women's 30 km freestyle	Did not start	
Devon Kershaw; Sean Crooks; Chris Jeffries; George Grey	Men's 4 x 10 km relay	1:48:15.9	11
Milaine Theriault; Sara Renner; Amanda Ammar; Beckie Scott	Women's 4 x 5 km relay	56:49.8	10

Sprint

Athlete	Event	Qualifying		Quarterfinal		Semifinal		Final	
Athlete	Event	Total	Rank	Total	Rank	Total	Rank	Total	Rank
Amanda Ammar	Women's sprint	2:22.78	49	Did not advance					49
Chandra Crawford	Women's sprint	2:51.06	8 Q	2:14.2	1 Q	2:13.4	1 Q	2:12.3	Gold medal
Sean Crooks	Men's sprint	2:20.70	32	Did not advance					32
Drew Goldsack	Men's sprint	2:20.62	31	Did not advance					31
Devon Kershaw	Men's sprint	2:21.49	37	Did not advance					37
Sara Renner	Women's sprint	2:15.37	9 Q	2:15.6	4	Did not advance			16
Beckie Scott	Women's sprint	2:12.45	1 Q	2:16.6	1 Q	2:15.8	2 Q	2:14.7	4
Phil Widmer	Men's sprint	2:23.79	47	Did not advance					47
George Grey; Devon Kershaw	Men's team sprint	n/a				17:31.2	6	Did not advance	11
Sara Renner; Beckie Scott	Women's team sprint	n/a				17:19.3	2 Q	16:37.5	Silver medal

== Curling ==
=== Men's ===
: Brad Gushue, Mark Nichols, Russ Howard (skip), Jamie Korab, Mike Adam (alternate)

The Canadian foursome won the country's first Olympic medal in men's curling, and became the first Winter Olympic gold medal winners from the province of Newfoundland and Labrador. Russ Howard was designated the skip by World Curling Federation rules, but Gushue threw last stones, and was considered to be the team leader.

Gushue's rink finished first in the round-robin at the Canadian Olympic Curling Trials, then beat Jeff Stoughton in the final to secure the Olympic berth.

Round-robin
Draw 2

Team	1	2	3	4	5	6	7	8	9	10	11	Final
Germany (Kapp)	2	0	2	0	0	0	0	1	0	x	-	5
Canada (Gushue)	0	2	0	3	1	1	1	0	2	x	-	10

;Draw 3

Team	1	2	3	4	5	6	7	8	9	10	11	Final
Canada (Gushue)	1	0	1	0	1	0	1	0	3	0	0	7
Sweden (Lindholm)	0	2	0	1	0	1	0	1	0	2	1	8

;Draw 4

Team	1	2	3	4	5	6	7	8	9	10	11	Final
Canada (Gushue)	1	1	0	3	0	1	1	0	2	x	-	9
Great Britain (Murdoch)	0	0	2	0	1	0	0	2	0	x	-	5

;Draw 5

Team	1	2	3	4	5	6	7	8	9	10	11	Final
Canada (Gushue)	1	0	0	1	1	1	1	1	0	1	-	7
Switzerland (Stockli)	0	1	3	0	0	0	0	0	1	0	-	5

;Draw 6

Team	1	2	3	4	5	6	7	8	9	10	11	Final
Norway (Trulsen)	0	0	1	1	1	0	0	0	2	0	-	5
Canada (Gushue)	2	1	0	0	0	0	1	1	0	1	-	6

;Draw 8

Team	1	2	3	4	5	6	7	8	9	10	11	Final
Finland (Uusipaavalniemi)	0	0	3	0	0	0	4	1	0	0	-	8
Canada (Gushue)	2	0	0	0	1	1	0	0	2	1	-	7

;Draw 9

Team	1	2	3	4	5	6	7	8	9	10	11	Final
Canada (Gushue)	0	0	1	0	0	1	1	0	2	1	0	6
Italy (Retornaz)	2	1	0	1	1	0	0	1	0	0	1	7

;Draw 11

Team	1	2	3	4	5	6	7	8	9	10	11	Final
New Zealand (Becker)	0	0	0	0	1	0	0	x	x	x	-	1
Canada (Gushue)	1	1	0	1	0	3	3	x	x	x	-	9

;Draw 12

Team	1	2	3	4	5	6	7	8	9	10	11	Final
Canada (Gushue)	0	0	0	2	0	0	0	2	1	1	-	6
United States (Fenson)	1	0	0	0	1	0	1	0	0	0	-	3

Standings

Rank	Team	Skip	Won	Lost
1	Finland	Markku Uusipaavalniemi	7	2
2	Canada	Brad Gushue	6	3
3	United States	Pete Fenson	6	3
4	Great Britain	David Murdoch	6	3
5	Norway	Pål Trulsen	5	4
6	Switzerland	Ralph Stockli	5	4
7	Italy	Joel Retornaz	4	5
8	Sweden	Peter Lindholm	3	6
9	Germany	Andy Kapp	3	6
10	New Zealand	Sean Becker	0	9

Playoffs
Semifinal

Team	1	2	3	4	5	6	7	8	9	10	11	Final
United States (Fenson)	1	0	1	0	1	0	0	2	0	x	-	5
Canada (Gushue)	0	2	0	2	0	2	0	0	5	x	-	11

;Final

Team	1	2	3	4	5	6	7	8	9	10	11	Final
Finland (Uusipavaalniemi)	2	0	0	0	1	0	0	1	x	x	-	5
Canada (Gushue)	0	2	1	1	0	6	0	0	x	x	-	11

The Minister of Education for Newfoundland and Labrador canceled classes across the province in the afternoon to allow children to watch the game.

=== Women's ===
: Shannon Kleibrink (skip), Amy Nixon, Glenys Bakker, Christine Keshen, Sandra Jenkins (alternate)

Shannon Kleibrink's rink finished third in the round-robin at the Canadian Olympic Curling Trials, then won the semifinal over Stefanie Lawton and the final over Kelly Scott to secure the Olympic berth.

Round-robin
Draw 1

Team	1	2	3	4	5	6	7	8	9	10	11	Final
Canada (Kleibrink)	0	0	0	2	0	0	2	0	1	0	-	5
Sweden (Norberg)	0	0	2	0	2	0	0	2	0	1	-	7

;Draw 2

Team	1	2	3	4	5	6	7	8	9	10	11	Final
United States (Johnson)	0	0	1	0	2	0	2	0	x	x	-	5
Canada (Kleibrink)	5	1	0	1	0	3	0	1	x	x	-	11

;Draw 3

Team	1	2	3	4	5	6	7	8	9	10	11	Final
Canada (Kleibrink)	0	0	1	0	0	2	0	2	0	1	-	6
Russia (Privakova)	0	0	0	1	1	0	1	0	2	x	-	5

;Draw 5

Team	1	2	3	4	5	6	7	8	9	10	11	Final
Canada (Kleibrink)	0	1	0	0	2	0	1	0	1	0	-	5
Switzerland (Ott)	0	0	0	3	0	0	0	2	0	1	-	6

;Draw 6

Team	1	2	3	4	5	6	7	8	9	10	11	Final
Canada (Kleibrink)	0	2	0	2	0	1	0	3	2	0	-	10
Norway (Nordby)	1	0	2	0	2	0	1	0	0	2	-	8

;Draw 7

Team	1	2	3	4	5	6	7	8	9	10	11	Final
Great Britain (Martin)	0	0	0	0	2	0	0	1	0	x	-	3
Canada (Kleibrink)	0	2	1	1	0	0	1	0	4	x	-	9

;Draw 8

Team	1	2	3	4	5	6	7	8	9	10	11	Final
Japan (Onodera)	0	0	2	1	0	0	1	0	0	1	-	5
Canada (Kleibrink)	0	0	0	0	0	1	0	1	0	0	-	2

;Draw 10

Team	1	2	3	4	5	6	7	8	9	10	11	Final
Italy (Gaspari)	0	0	0	2	0	1	1	0	0	x	-	4
Canada (Kleibrink)	1	2	2	0	2	0	0	2	2	x	-	11

;Draw 12

Team	1	2	3	4	5	6	7	8	9	10	11	Final
Denmark (Holm)	2	0	3	0	0	0	1	0	2	0	-	8
Canada (Kleibrink)	0	3	0	3	0	1	0	1	0	1	-	9

Standings

Rank	Team	Skip	Won	Lost
1	Sweden	Anette Norberg	7	2
2	Switzerland	Mirjam Ott	7	2
3	Canada	Shannon Kleibrink	6	3
4	Norway	Dordi Nordby	6	3
5	Great Britain	Rhona Martin	5	4
6	Russia	Ludmila Privivkova	5	4
7	Japan	Ayumi Onodera	4	5
8	Denmark	Dorthe Holm	2	7
9	United States	Cassandra Johnson	2	7
10	Italy	Diana Gaspari	1	8

Playoffs
Semifinal

Team	1	2	3	4	5	6	7	8	9	10	11	Final
Switzerland (Ott)	0	0	3	0	1	1	0	2	0	0	-	7
Canada (Kleibrink)	0	1	0	1	0	0	2	0	1	0	-	5

;Bronze final

Team	1	2	3	4	5	6	7	8	9	10	Final
Norway (Nordby)	0	0	1	1	0	2	0	1	X	X	5
Canada (Kleibrink)	4	1	0	0	4	0	2	0	X	X	11

Key: The hammer indicates which team had the last stone in the first end.

== Figure skating ==
Athlete	Event	CD		SP/OD		FS/FD		Total	
Athlete	Event	Points	Rank	Points	Rank	Points	Rank	Points	Rank
Jeffrey Buttle	Men's	n/a		73.29	6 Q	154.30	2	227.59	Bronze medal
Mira Leung	Ladies'	n/a		50.61	14 Q	94.55	12	145.16	12
Joannie Rochette	Ladies'	n/a		55.85	9 Q	111.42	5	167.27	5
Emanuel Sandhu	Men's	n/a		69.75	7 Q	120.49	14	190.24	13
Shawn Sawyer	Men's	n/a		67.20	12 Q	123.63	12	190.24	12
Jessica Dubé; Bryce Davison	Pairs	n/a		55.48	11	104.23	10	159.71	10
Marie-France Dubreuil; Patrice Lauzon	Ice dance	37.44	4	54.36	7	Withdrew			
Valérie Marcoux; Craig Buntin	Pairs	n/a		55.62	10	102.59	11	158.21	11
Megan Wing; Aaron Lowe	Ice dance	31.42	12	49.17	12	85.81	12	166.40	11

Key: CD = Compulsory Dance, FD = Free Dance, FS = Free Skate, OD = Original Dance, SP = Short Program

== Freestyle skiing ==
Jennifer Heil became the first Canadian woman to ever win gold in freestyle skiing after winning for women's moguls. At the 2002 Winter Olympics in Salt Lake City, she finished fourth and ended up a hundredth of a point off the podium.

Dale Begg-Smith, who won gold in men's moguls for Australia, was born in Canada and holds dual citizenship. He originally started skiing in Canada but found Canada's training program too restrictive. He moved to Australia to have more time to work on his business interests. Ironically, his win bumped Marc-André Moreau down to 4th place and off of the podium.

Men

Athlete	Event	Qualifying		Final	
Athlete	Event	Points	Rank	Points	Rank
Jeff Bean	Men's aerials	198.49	19	Did not advance	19
Alexandre Bilodeau	Men's moguls	23.75	11 Q	23.42	11
Marc-André Moreau	Men's moguls	24.69	3 Q	25.62	4
Kyle Nissen	Men's aerials	231.64	7 Q	244.91	5
Steve Omischl	Men's aerials	198.23	20	Did not advance	20
Warren Shouldice	Men's aerials	243.45	3 Q	239.70	6
Chris Wong	Men's moguls	23.89	9 Q	22.88	14

Women

Athlete	Event	Qualifying		Final	
Athlete	Event	Points	Rank	Points	Rank
Veronika Bauer	Women's aerials	176.66	5 Q	125.65	12
Deidra Dionne	Women's aerials	128.30	22	Did not advance	22
Jennifer Heil	Women's moguls	26.67	1 Q	26.50	Gold medal
Amber Peterson	Women's aerials	153.07	15	Did not advance	15
Kristi Richards	Women's moguls	23.76	8 Q	23.30	7
Audrey Robichaud	Women's moguls	22.73	12 Q	23.10	8
Stéphanie St-Pierre	Women's moguls	22.15	17 Q	22.52	12

== Ice hockey ==
Hockey, like the previous two Olympics, attracted significant attention from Canadian fans. Many consider the Canadian men's team's performance in Turin as the most disappointing in years. In the last four games of the tournament, Canada failed to score in 11 of 12 periods, losing with the same score (2–0) against Switzerland, Finland, and in the quarterfinals against Russia. Hockey commentators, including Kelly Hrudey, commented that Canada did not play well as a team. The match against the Czech Republic was believed to be a better performance by the hockey team but the team lost to Russia two days after.

The quarterfinal game against Russia was watched on television screens across the nation in the afternoon Canadian time. The intensity of the game increased as the scoreless tie extended into the third period.

However, in the women's hockey discipline, Team Canada dominated the field with numerous wins leading up to their gold medal winning game.

=== Men's ===
Players

The following is the Canadian roster for the men's ice hockey tournament at the 2006 Winter Olympics.

Head coach: Pat Quinn

Assistant coaches: Wayne Fleming, Marc Habscheid, Ken Hitchcock, Jacques Martin

No.	Pos.	Name	Height	Weight	Birthdate	Team
1	G	Roberto Luongo	191 cm (6 ft 3 in)	93 kg (205 lb)	April 19, 1979 (aged 26)	(United States) Florida Panthers
3	D	Jay Bouwmeester	193 cm (6 ft 4 in)	88 kg (194 lb)	September 7, 1983 (aged 22)	(United States) Florida Panthers
4	D	Rob Blake (A)	193 cm (6 ft 4 in)	102 kg (225 lb)	December 10, 1969 (aged 36)	(United States) Colorado Avalanche
6	D	Wade Redden	188 cm (6 ft 2 in)	95 kg (209 lb)	June 12, 1977 (aged 28)	(Canada) Ottawa Senators
9	F	Shane Doan	188 cm (6 ft 2 in)	98 kg (216 lb)	October 10, 1976 (aged 29)	(United States) Phoenix Coyotes
12	F	Jarome Iginla (A)	185 cm (6 ft 1 in)	95 kg (209 lb)	July 1, 1977 (aged 28)	(Canada) Calgary Flames
14	F	Todd Bertuzzi	191 cm (6 ft 3 in)	111 kg (245 lb)	February 2, 1975 (aged 31)	(Canada) Vancouver Canucks
15	F	Dany Heatley	191 cm (6 ft 3 in)	98 kg (216 lb)	January 21, 1981 (aged 25)	(Canada) Ottawa Senators
21	F	Simon Gagné (A)	183 cm (6 ft 0 in)	84 kg (185 lb)	February 29, 1980 (aged 25)	(United States) Philadelphia Flyers
24	D	Bryan McCabe	188 cm (6 ft 2 in)	100 kg (220 lb)	June 8, 1975 (aged 30)	(Canada) Toronto Maple Leafs
26	F	Martin St. Louis	175 cm (5 ft 9 in)	84 kg (185 lb)	June 18, 1975 (aged 30)	(United States) Tampa Bay Lightning
28	D	Robyn Regehr	191 cm (6 ft 3 in)	102 kg (225 lb)	April 19, 1980 (aged 25)	(Canada) Calgary Flames
30	G	Martin Brodeur	188 cm (6 ft 2 in)	95 kg (209 lb)	May 6, 1972 (aged 33)	(United States) New Jersey Devils
33	F	Kris Draper	178 cm (5 ft 10 in)	86 kg (190 lb)	May 24, 1971 (aged 34)	(United States) Detroit Red Wings
35	G	Marty Turco	180 cm (5 ft 11 in)	83 kg (183 lb)	August 13, 1975 (aged 30)	(United States) Dallas Stars
39	F	Brad Richards	185 cm (6 ft 1 in)	90 kg (200 lb)	May 2, 1980 (aged 25)	(United States) Tampa Bay Lightning
40	F	Vincent Lecavalier	193 cm (6 ft 4 in)	93 kg (205 lb)	April 21, 1980 (aged 25)	(United States) Tampa Bay Lightning
44	D	Chris Pronger (A)	198 cm (6 ft 6 in)	100 kg (220 lb)	October 10, 1974 (aged 31)	(Canada) Edmonton Oilers
52	D	Adam Foote	188 cm (6 ft 2 in)	98 kg (216 lb)	July 10, 1971 (aged 34)	(United States) Columbus Blue Jackets
61	F	Rick Nash	193 cm (6 ft 4 in)	93 kg (205 lb)	June 16, 1984 (aged 21)	(United States) Columbus Blue Jackets
91	F	Joe Sakic (C)	180 cm (5 ft 11 in)	88 kg (194 lb)	July 7, 1969 (aged 36)	(United States) Colorado Avalanche
94	F	Ryan Smyth	185 cm (6 ft 1 in)	86 kg (190 lb)	February 21, 1976 (aged 29)	(Canada) Edmonton Oilers
97	F	Joe Thornton	193 cm (6 ft 4 in)	102 kg (225 lb)	July 2, 1979 (aged 26)	(United States) San Jose Sharks

Defencemen Scott Niedermayer and Ed Jovanovski were originally selected, but due to injuries were replaced by Jay Bouwmeester and Bryan McCabe, respectively. Dan Boyle took McCabe's previous spot as a reserve. Defenceman Dan Boyle and forwards Jason Spezza and Eric Staal were selected as "reserves" in case of injury before the tournament began.

Round-robin

Pos	Team	Pld	W	D	L	GF	GA	GD	Pts	Qualification
1	Finland	5	5	0	0	19	2	+17	10	Quarterfinals
2	Switzerland	5	2	2	1	10	12	−2	6	Quarterfinals
3	Canada	5	3	0	2	15	9	+6	6	Quarterfinals
4	Czech Republic	5	2	0	3	14	12	+2	4	Quarterfinals
5	Germany	5	0	2	3	7	16	−9	2	
6	Italy (H)	5	0	2	3	9	23	−14	2	

Source: IIHF
(H) Hosts

15 February 2006; 13:05	Italy	2–7 (0–1, 2–5, 0–1)	Canada	Palasport Olimpico, Turin; Attendance: 8,575

Game reference

Jason Muzzatti
Goalies
Martin Brodeur
Referee:
(Sweden) Thomas Andersson
Linesmen:
(Slovakia) Miroslav Halecký
(Russia) Sergei Shelyanin

	0–1	5:33 – J. Iginla (T. Bertuzzi, J. Sakic) (PP)
J. Cirone (G. Scandella) (PP) – 20:43	1–1
	1–2	21:55 – D. Heatley (M. St. Louis, V. Lecavalier)
	1–3	25:38 – S. Doan (C. Pronger, B. Richards)
	1–4	26:04 – J. Iginla (J. Sakic) (PP)
	1–5	33:53 – M. St. Louis (D. Heatley, V. Lecavalier)
	1–6	34:38 – B. Richards (S. Doan, T. Bertuzzi)
J. Parco (T. Tuzzolino) – 38:08	2–6
	2–7	43:39 – J. Thornton (S. Gagné) (PP)

20 min
Penalties
12 min
20
Shots
50

16 February 2006; 13:05	Czech Republic	2–3 (0–1, 1–1, 1–1)	Switzerland	Torino Esposizioni, Turin; Attendance: 3,400

Game reference

Tomáš Vokoun
Goalies
David Aebischer
Referee:
(United States) Dennis LaRue
Linesmen:
(United States) Tony Sericolo
(Russia) Sergei Shelyanin

	0–1	5:11 – T. Ziegler (I. Rüthemann)
J. Jágr (M. Straka, V. Prospal) – 22:55	1–1
	1–2	29:44 – T. Paterlini (SH)
M. Židlický (A. Hemský, M. Ručinský) – 41:00	2–2
	2–3	46:42 – M. Streit (M. Seger, M. Plüss) (PP)

14 min
Penalties
20 min
42
Shots
19

18 February 2006; 15:35	Canada	0–2 (0–1, 0–1, 0–0)	Switzerland	Torino Esposizioni, Turin; Attendance: 4,769

Game reference
Martin Brodeur	Goalies	Martin Gerber	Referee: (Russia) Vyacheslav Bulanov; Linesmen: (Slovakia) Miroslav Halecký (United States) Kevin Redding
0–1 / 18:19 – P. DiPietro (P. Della Rossa); 0–2 / 28:47 – P. DiPietro (G. Bezina, M. Streit) (PP2)			Referee: (Russia) Vyacheslav Bulanov; Linesmen: (Slovakia) Miroslav Halecký (United States) Kevin Redding
34 min	Penalties	42 min	Referee: (Russia) Vyacheslav Bulanov; Linesmen: (Slovakia) Miroslav Halecký (United States) Kevin Redding
49	Shots	18	Referee: (Russia) Vyacheslav Bulanov; Linesmen: (Slovakia) Miroslav Halecký (United States) Kevin Redding

19 February 2006; 21:05	Finland	2–0 (2–0, 0–0, 0–0)	Canada	Torino Esposizioni, Turin; Attendance: 4,420

Game reference
Antero Niittymäki	Goalies	Roberto Luongo	Referee: (Czech Republic) Vladimír Šindler; Linesmen: (Slovakia) Milan Mášik (United States) Thor Nelson
T. Selänne (S. Koivu) – 11:14 / 1–0; N. Kapanen (V. Nieminen, K. Timonen) – 15:02 / 2–0			Referee: (Czech Republic) Vladimír Šindler; Linesmen: (Slovakia) Milan Mášik (United States) Thor Nelson
6 min	Penalties	12 min	Referee: (Czech Republic) Vladimír Šindler; Linesmen: (Slovakia) Milan Mášik (United States) Thor Nelson
30	Shots	24	Referee: (Czech Republic) Vladimír Šindler; Linesmen: (Slovakia) Milan Mášik (United States) Thor Nelson

21 February 2006; 16:35	Canada	3–2 (3–0, 0–1, 0–1)	Czech Republic	Palasport Olimpico, Turin; Attendance: 9,126

Game reference

Martin Brodeur
Goalies
Tomáš Vokoun (out 20:00)
Milan Hnilička (in 20:00)
Referee:
(Canada) Dan Marouelli
Linesmen:
(Sweden) Joacim Karlsson
(United States) Thor Nelson

B. Richards (J. Iginla, C. Pronger) – 7:37	1–0
M. St. Louis (V. Lecavalier, R. Blake) (PP) – 11:19	2–0
C. Pronger (J. Thornton) – 19:24	3–0
	3–1	33:46 – P. Kubina (J. Jágr, M. Ručinský) (PP)
	3–2	42:41 – P. Čajánek (T. Kaberle, A. Hemský)

8 min
Penalties
4 min
16
Shots
33

Medal round

Quarterfinal

22 February 2006; 20:35	Russia	2–0 (0–0, 0–0, 2–0)	Canada	Torino Esposizioni, Turin; Attendance: 4,130

Game reference
Evgeni Nabokov	Goalies	Martin Brodeur	Referee: (United States) Dennis LaRue; Linesmen: (Sweden) Joacim Karlsson (United States) Tony Sericolo
A. Ovechkin (V. Kozlov) (PP) – 41:30 / 1–0; A. Kovalev (A. Markov) (PP) – 59:37 / 2–0			Referee: (United States) Dennis LaRue; Linesmen: (Sweden) Joacim Karlsson (United States) Tony Sericolo
41 min	Penalties	18 min	Referee: (United States) Dennis LaRue; Linesmen: (Sweden) Joacim Karlsson (United States) Tony Sericolo
33	Shots	27	Referee: (United States) Dennis LaRue; Linesmen: (Sweden) Joacim Karlsson (United States) Tony Sericolo

=== Women's ===
Players

No.	Position	Name	S / C	Height	Weight	Birthdate	Birthplace	2004–05 team
2	F	Meghan Agosta	R	168	67	02/12/87	Windsor, Ontario	Windsor Jr. AA
10	F	Gillian Apps	L	183	80	11/02/83	North York, Ontario	Dartmouth Big Green women's ice hockey
17	F	Jennifer Botterill	L	175	69	05/01/79	Winnipeg, Manitoba	Toronto Aeros
77	F	Cassie Campbell – C	L	170	68	11/22/73	Richmond Hill, Ontario	Calgary Oval X-Treme
9	D	Gillian Ferrari	R	173	70	06/23/80	Richmond Hill, Ontario	Brampton Thunder
15	F	Danielle Goyette	L	170	67	01/30/66	Saint-Nazaire, Quebec	Calgary Oval X-Treme
16	F	Jayna Hefford	L	165	63	05/14/77	Trenton, Ontario	Brampton Thunder
4	D	Becky Kellar	L	170	67	01/01/75	Haldimand, Ontario	Oakville Ice
27	F	Gina Kingsbury	L	173	62	11/26/81	Uranium City, Saskatchewan	Montreal Axion
32	G	Charline Labonté	L	175	78	10/15/82	Greenfield Park, Quebec	Montreal Axion
3	D	Carla MacLeod	R	163	60	06/16/82	Edmonton, Alberta	Wisconsin Badgers women's ice hockey
13	D	Caroline Ouellette	L	180	78	05/25/79	Montreal, Quebec	University of Minnesota Duluth
7	F	Cherie Piper	R	168	76	06/29/81	Toronto, Ontario	Dartmouth Big Green women's ice hockey
11	D	Cheryl Pounder – A	R	168	65	06/21/76	Montreal, Quebec	Toronto Aeros
5	D	Colleen Sostorics	R	163	78	12/17/79	Regina, Saskatchewan	Calgary Oval X-Treme
33	G	Kim St-Pierre	L	175	71	12/14/78	Lasalle, Quebec	Quebec Avalanche
61	F	Vicky Sunohara – A	L	170	78	05/18/70	Scarborough, Ontario	Brampton Thunder
26	F	Sarah Vaillancourt	R	168	63	05/08/85	Fleurimont, Quebec	Harvard Crimson women's ice hockey
8	F	Katie Weatherston	R	158	61	04/06/83	Thunder Bay, Ontario	Dartmouth Big Green women's ice hockey
22	F	Hayley Wickenheiser – A	R	178	77	08/12/78	Shaunavon, Saskatchewan	Calgary Oval X-Treme

Round-robin

Pos	Team	Pld	W	D	L	GF	GA	GD	Pts	Qualification
1	Canada	3	3	0	0	36	1	+35	6	Semifinals
2	Sweden	3	2	0	1	15	9	+6	4	Semifinals
3	Russia	3	1	0	2	6	16	−10	2	5–8th place semifinals
4	Italy (H)	3	0	0	3	1	32	−31	0	5–8th place semifinals

(H) Hosts

11 February 2006; 20:35	Canada	16–0 (5–0, 4–0, 7–0)	Italy	Palasport Olimpico, Turin; Attendance: 8,399

Game reference

Kim St-Pierre
Goalies
Debora Montanari
Luana Frasnelli
Referee:
(United States) Danyel Howard
Linesmen:
(Finland) Sanna Mattila
(Netherlands) Ilse Robben

Ouellette (Hefford, MacLeod) – 01:36	1–0
Ouellette (Hefford, Botterill) – 01:52	2–0
Wickenheiser (Piper) – 04:04	3–0
Ouellette (Botterill, Campbell) (PP) – 06:53	4–0
Pounder (Kellar) – 11:34	5–0
Vaillancourt (Piper) – 20:25	6–0
MacLeod (Campbell, Apps) – 22:32	7–0
Piper (Wickenheiser, Apps) – 38:45	8–0
Wickenheiser (Piper, Apps) – 39:56	9–0
Apps (Piper, Wickenheiser) – 41:35	10–0
Botterill (Ouellette, MacLeod) – 47:31	11–0
Hefford (Ouellette, Botterill) (PP) – 48:41	12–0
Pounder – 49:42	13–0
Goyette (Campbell, Sunohara) – 52:19	14–0
Apps (Piper, Wickenheiser) (PP) – 56:15	15–0
Weatherston (Agosta, Vaillancourt) – 57:37	16–0

8 min
Penalties
10 min
66
Shots
5

12 February 2006; 16:35	Russia	0–12 (0–7, 0–2, 0–3)	Canada	Torino Esposizioni, Turin; Attendance: 2,414

Game reference

Irina Gashennikova
Nadezhda Alexandrova
Goalies
Charline Labonte
Referee:
(United Kingdom) Joy Tottman
Linesmen:
(Finland) Johanna Suban
(Czech Republic) Jana Zítková

0–1	04:53 – Sunohara (Ouellette, Goyette)
0–2	06:52 – Agosta (Kinsbury, Weatherston)
0–3	10:00 – Piper (Apps) (SH)
0–4	15:14 – Goyette (Campbell)
0–5	16:18 – Piper (Wickenheiser)
0–6	17:48 – Wickenheiser (SH)
0–7	19:20 – Agosta (Vaillancourt)
0–8	27:19 – Weatherston (Ouellette, Vaillancourt)
0–9	33:27 – Agosta (PP)
0–10	41:16 – Piper (Wickenheiser)
0–11	47:47 – Vaillancourt (Hefford, Botterill)
0–12	52:33 – MacLeod (Wickenheiser)

28 min
Penalties
14 min
17
Shots
43

14 February 2006; 15:35	Canada	8–1 (2–0, 5–1, 1–0)	Sweden	Palasport Olimpico, Turin; Attendance: 6,850

Game reference

Kim St-Pierre
Goalies
Cecilia Andersson
Referee:
(Finland) Anu Hirvonen
Linesmen:
(Finland) Sanna Mattila
(United States) Julie Piacentini

Apps – 04:36	1–0
Wickenheiser (Pounder) – 12:28	2–0
Apps (PP) – 23:53	3–0
Apps (Wickenheiser, Piper) – 30:58	4–0
Goyette (Piper, Campbell) (PP) – 34:02	5–0
	5–1	36:12 – Lindberg (Jansson, Winberg) (PP)
Weatherston (Kingsbury) – 37:25	6–1
Hefford (PP) – 38:53	7–1
Goyette (Piper, Wickenheiser) (PP) – 46:02	8–1

14 min
Penalties
16 min
47
Shots
8

Medal round

Semifinal

17 February 2006; 21:05	Canada	6–0 (2–0, 2–0, 2–0)	Finland	Palasport Olimpico, Turin; Attendance: 7,306

Game reference

Charline Labonté
Goalies
Maija Hassinen
Noora Räty
Referee:
(United States) Danyel Howard
Linesmen:
(United States) Julie Piacentini
(Czech Republic) Klára Quagliato

Weatherston (Sostorics) (PP) – 17:33	1–0
Apps (Kingsbury, Goyette) (PP) – 19:15	2–0
Wickenheiser (Apps) (PP) – 34:59	3–0
Ouellette (Sunohara) (PP) – 36:26	4–0
Piper (Wickenheiser, Apps) – 47:49	5–0
Piper (Wickenheiser, Apps) (PP) – 54:47	6–0

14 min
Penalties
16 min
40
Shots
17

Final

20 February 2006; 20:35	(silver) Sweden	1–4 (0–2, 0–2, 1–0)	Canada (gold)	Palasport Olimpico, Turin; Attendance: 6,664

Game reference

Kim Martin
Goalies
Charline Labonté
Referee:
(Finland) Anu Hirvonen
Linesmen:
(Czech Republic) Klára Quagliato
(Finland) Johanna Suban

	0–1	03:15 – Apps (Wickenheiser)
	0–2	12:13 – Ouellette (Hefford, Botterill)
	0–3	28:58 – Piper (Wickenheiser, Pounder)
	0–4	30:27 – Hefford (Botterill, Vaillancourt)
G. Andersson (Holst, Rooth) (PP) – 45:24	1–4

6 min
Penalties
12 min
8
Shots
26

== Luge ==
Athlete	Event	Final					
Athlete	Event	Run 1	Run 2	Run 3	Run 4	Total	Rank
Jeff Christie	Men's singles	52.382	52.027	52.013	51.939	3:28.361	14
Ian Cockerline	Men's singles	52.290	52.107	52.255	Did not finish		
Samuel Edney	Men's singles	52.663	52.523	52.360	52.311	3:29.857	19
Alex Gough	Women's singles	48.286	49.902	47.922	48.045	3:14.155	20
Regan Lauscher	Women's singles	47.584	47.418	47.320	47.321	3:09.643	10
Meaghan Simister	Women's singles	48.185	48.682	Did not finish			
Grant Albrecht; Eric Pothier	Doubles	47.478	48.083	n/a		1:35.561	10
Chris Moffat; Mike Moffat	Doubles	47.715	47.826	n/a		1:35.541	9

== Nordic combined ==
Athlete	Event	Ski jumping		Cross-country		
Athlete	Event	Points	Rank	Deficit	Time	Rank
Jason Myslicki	Sprint	90.0	43	2:23	21:23.1 +2:54.1	41
Jason Myslicki	Individual Gundersen	207.5	32	3:40	46:21.0 +6:36.4	41
Max Thompson	Sprint	84.5	45	2:45	22:09.3 +3:40.3	46
Max Thompson	Individual Gundersen	171.5	46	6:04	47:57.8 +8:13.2	44

Note: 'Deficit' refers to the amount of time behind the leader a competitor began the cross-country portion of the event. Italicized numbers show the final deficit from the winner's finishing time.

== Short track speed skating ==
Men

Athlete	Event	Heat		Quarterfinal		Semifinal		Final	
Athlete	Event	Time	Rank	Time	Rank	Time	Rank	Time	Rank
Éric Bédard	500 m	42.480	1 Q	42.267	1 Q	41.950	2 Q	42.093	4
Éric Bédard	1000 m	1:28.274	1 Q	1:27.546	2 Q	Disqualified			
Charles Hamelin	1500 m	2:19.469	1 Q	n/a		2:20.854	1 Q	2:26.375	4
François-Louis Tremblay	500 m	42.779	2 Q	42.110	2 Q	42.261	1 Q	42.002	Silver medal
François-Louis Tremblay	1000 m	1:28.925	1 Q	Disqualified					
Mathieu Turcotte	1500 m	2:23.402	1 Q	n/a		2:18.280	3	Final B 2:24.558	6
Éric Bédard; Jonathan Guilmette; Charles Hamelin; François-Louis Tremblay; Mathieu Turcotte	5000 m relay	n/a				6:57.004	1	6:43.707	Silver medal

Women

Athlete	Event	Heat		Quarterfinal		Semifinal		Final	
Athlete	Event	Time	Rank	Time	Rank	Time	Rank	Time	Rank
Alanna Kraus	500 m	45.688	1 Q	45.172	3	Did not advance			9
Anouk Leblanc-Boucher	500 m	45.929	1 Q	44.821	2 Q	45.234	2 Q	44.759	Bronze medal
Anouk Leblanc-Boucher	1500 m	2:28.001	4	Did not advance					16
Amanda Overland	1000 m	1:33.761	1 Q	1:33.012	2 Q	1:33.102	3	Final B 1:34.191	5
Amanda Overland	1500 m	2:27.666	2 Q	n/a		2:22.946	2 Q	2:26.495	5
Kalyna Roberge	500 m	45.396	1 Q	45.710	2 Q	44.960	3	Final B 46.605	4
Tania Vicent	1000 m	1:33.904	1 Q	1:35.594	3 ADV	1:32.650	3	Final B 1:34.099	4
Alanna Kraus; Anouk Leblanc-Boucher; Amanda Overland; Kalyna Roberge; Tania Vicent	3000 m relay	n/a				4:17.231	2 Q	4:17.336	Silver medal

Key: 'ADV' indicates a skater was advanced due to being interfered with.

== Skeleton ==
Mellisa Hollingsworth-Richards won a bronze medal in Skeleton, thus becoming the first Canadian to win an Olympic medal in the event. A day later, Duff Gibson became the first Canadian to win a gold medal in the event after taking the men's gold. Fellow Canadian Jeff Pain won the silver medal, and there were chances of a bronze as well; however, their teammate placed fourth.

Gibson, 39, became the oldest competitor to win an individual gold medal in Winter Olympics history, surpassing Al MacInnis as the oldest Canadian to win a gold medal. MacInnis won gold at the 2002 Winter Olympics on the Canadian men's hockey team.

Athlete	Event	Final			
Athlete	Event	Run 1	Run 2	Total	Rank
Lindsay Alcock	Women's	1:01.26	1:01.59	2:02.85	10
Paul Boehm	Men's	58.61	58.45	1:57.06	4
Duff Gibson	Men's	57.80	58.08	1:55.88	Gold medal
Mellisa Hollingsworth-Richards	Women's	1:00.39	1:01.02	2:01.41	Bronze medal
Jeff Pain	Men's	57.98	58.16	1:56.14	Silver medal

== Ski jumping ==
Athlete	Event	Qualifying		First round		Final		
Athlete	Event	Points	Rank	Points	Rank	Points	Total	Rank
Gregory Baxter	Normal hill	100.0	41	Did not advance				41
Gregory Baxter	Large hill	58.5	24	Did not advance				41
Graeme Gorham	Normal hill	97.5	42	Did not advance				42
Graeme Gorham	Large hill	69.4	35 Q	61.1	50	Did not advance		50
Michael Nell	Normal hill	83.5	50	Did not advance				50
Michael Nell	Large hill	48.0	49	Did not advance				49
Stefan Read	Normal hill	114.5	21 Q	105.0	42	Did not advance		42
Stefan Read	Large hill	88.5	19 Q	98.8	26 Q	89.4	188.2	30
Gregory Baxter; Graeme Gorham; Michael Nell; Stefan Read	Team	276.8	15	Did not advance				15

Note: PQ indicates a skier was pre-qualified for the final, based on entry rankings.

== Snowboarding ==
Maëlle Ricker and Dominique Vallee competed in two of the Snowboarding disciplines, halfpipe and snowboard cross, while Jasey-Jay Anderson competed in snowboard cross and parallel giant slalom.

Halfpipe

Athlete	Event	Qualifying run 1		Qualifying run 2		Final		
Athlete	Event	Points	Rank	Points	Rank	Run 1	Run 2	Rank
Sarah Conrad	Women's halfpipe	19.4	20	33.5	9	Did not advance		15
Justin Lamoureux	Men's halfpipe	10.1	41	31.5	15	Did not advance		21
Crispin Lipscomb	Men's halfpipe	19.6	30	37.9	6 Q	(23.4)	33.5	11
Brad Martin	Men's halfpipe	27.2	21	34.7	10	Did not advance		16
Hugo Lemay	Men's halfpipe	26.0	24	34.1	12	Did not advance		18
Mercedes Nicoll	Women's halfpipe	33.0	9	17.5	21	Did not advance		27
Maëlle Ricker	Women's halfpipe	25.9	16	23.2	23	Did not advance		29
Dominique Vallee	Women's halfpipe	31.5	12	24.5	15	Did not advance		21

Note: In the final, the single best score from two runs is used to determine the ranking. A bracketed score indicates a run that wasn't counted.

Parallel GS

Athlete	Event	Qualification		Round of 16	Quarterfinals	Semifinals	Finals	
Athlete	Event	Time	Rank	Opposition Time	Opposition Time	Opposition Time	Opposition Time	Rank
Jasey-Jay Anderson	Men's parallel giant slalom	1:12.75	20	Did not advance				20
Philippe Berubé	Men's parallel giant slalom	1:30.03	29	Did not advance				29
Alexa Loo	Women's parallel giant slalom	1:23.51	20	Did not advance				20

Key: '+ Time' represents a deficit; the brackets indicate the results of each run.

Snowboard cross

Athlete	Event	Qualifying		1/8 finals	Quarterfinals	Semifinals	Finals	
Athlete	Event	Time	Rank	Position	Position	Position	Position	Rank
Jasey-Jay Anderson	Men's snowboard cross	1:22.27	20 Q	1 Q	1 Q	4	Small final 1	5
Francois Boivin	Men's snowboard cross	1:23.17	30 Q	2 Q	3	Did not advance	Classification 9–12; 2	10
Dominique Maltais	Women's snowboard cross	1:29.33	2 Q	n/a	1 Q	2 Q	3	Bronze medal
Drew Neilson	Men's snowboard cross	1:19:93	1 Q	3	Did not advance			17
Maëlle Ricker	Women's snowboard cross	1:27.85	1 Q	n/a	1 Q	1 Q	4	4
Erin Simmons	Women's snowboard cross	1:32.74	17	Did not advance				17
Dominique Vallee	Women's snowboard cross	1:33.57	19	Did not advance				19
Tom Velisek	Men's snowboard cross	1:22.12	18 Q	3	Did not advance			23

== Speed skating ==
Canada became the first country to set a new record at the 2006 Winter Olympics when both its men's and women's teams set an Olympic record in the qualifying round of the team pursuit.

Cindy Klassen set or tied several medal records. She became the first Canadian to win five medals in one Olympics, winning a gold (1500 m), two silver medals (team pursuit, 1000 m) and two bronze medals (3000 m, 5000 m). Her bronze medal at the 2002 Winter Olympics gives her a total of six medals and the title of the most decorated Canadian Olympian, winter or summer. Tied at five medals for Canada are short track speed skater Marc Gagnon, track athlete Dr. Phil Edwards, and speed skater Clara Hughes, who won her fourth and fifth medal at the 2006 Olympics. In addition to the Canadian medal records, Klassen also tied Eric Heiden to win the most medals by a speed skater at a single Olympics.

Men

Athlete	Event	Race 1		Final	
Athlete	Event	Time	Rank	Time	Rank
Arne Dankers	1500 m	n/a		1:48.42	17
Arne Dankers	5000 m	n/a		6:21.26	5
Arne Dankers	10000 m	n/a		13:23.55	9
Steven Elm	1000 m	n/a		1:11.36	29
Steven Elm	1500 m	n/a		1:48.09	12
Steven Elm	5000 m	n/a		6:41.53	22
Michael Ireland	500 m	35.59	35.29	1:10.88	7
Vincent Labrie	500 m	36.31	36.12	1:12.43	29
Brock Miron	500 m	36.42	36.12	1:12.54	30
Denny Morrison	1000 m	n/a		1:10.44	19
Denny Morrison	1500 m	n/a		1:48.04	11
François-Olivier Roberge	1000 m	n/a		1:10.20	16
Justin Warsylewicz	1500 m	n/a		1:49.77	27
Justin Warsylewicz	5000 m	n/a		6:43.74	24
Jeremy Wotherspoon	500 m	35.37	35.68	1:11.05	9
Jeremy Wotherspoon	1000 m	n/a		1:09.76	11

Women

Athlete	Event	Race 1		Final	
Athlete	Event	Time	Rank	Time	Rank
Kristina Groves	1000 m	n/a		1:16.54	5
Kristina Groves	1500 m	n/a		1:56.74	Silver medal
Kristina Groves	3000 m	n/a		4:09.03	8
Kristina Groves	5000 m	n/a		7:03.95	6
Clara Hughes	3000 m	n/a		4:09.17	9
Clara Hughes	5000 m	n/a		6:59.07	Gold medal
Cindy Klassen	1000 m	n/a		1:16.09	Silver medal
Cindy Klassen	1500 m	n/a		1:55.27	Gold medal
Cindy Klassen	3000 m	n/a		4:04.37	Bronze medal
Cindy Klassen	5000 m	n/a		7:00.57	Bronze medal
Krisy Myers	500 m	39.83	39.60	1:19.43	22
Christine Nesbitt	1000 m	n/a		1:17.54	14
Christine Nesbitt	1500 m	n/a		1:59.15	7
Shannon Rempel	500 m	39.42	39.43	1:18.85	16
Shannon Rempel	1000 m	n/a		1:18.35	24
Shannon Rempel	1500 m	n/a		2:02.24	28
Kerry Simpson	500 m	39.69	39.65	1:19.34	21
Kim Weger	500 m	40.01	39.98	1:19.99	26

Team pursuit

Athlete	Event	Seeding		Quarterfinal	Semifinal	Final	
Athlete	Event	Time	Rank	Opposition Time	Opposition Time	Opposition Time	Rank
From: Arne Dankers; Steven Elm; Denny Morrison; Jason Parker; Justin Warsylewicz	Men's team pursuit	3:47.37	1 OR	Japan (8); W 3:52.01	Norway (4); W 3:44.91	Italy (2); L 3:47.28	Silver medal
From: Kristina Groves; Clara Hughes; Cindy Klassen; Christine Nesbitt; Shannon Rempel	Women's team pursuit	3:06.45	3	United States (6); W 3:01.24	Japan (7); W 3:02.13	Germany (2); L 3:02.91	Silver medal

== Flag bearer ==
Women's ice hockey player Danielle Goyette carried the flag for Canada in the opening ceremony. Cross-country skier Beckie Scott, bobsledder Pierre Lueders, long-track speedskaters Cindy Klassen and Clara Hughes all said that they would not submit their names to carry the flag.

Scott, Klassen and Hughes all had events within two days of the opening ceremonies and believed that not participating in the opening ceremonies would give them a better chance at a finishing well in their events. Lueders turned down the chance because at the time it appeared that his bobsleigh partner, Lascelles Brown, would not be granted Canadian citizenship. Afterwards, Lueders said he would carry the flag but said that Brown would be a much better choice.

Some criticized these choices, including hockey analyst Don Cherry, who called the athletes unpatriotic and said that other athletes would have loved to have had the opportunity. Others, including past flag bearer Catriona Le May Doan spoke in favour of their decisions, saying that the opening ceremonies were a long process and took a lot of energy. She criticized Don Cherry, saying that many athletes in the past had turned down the flag-bearing opportunity at the opening ceremonies in order to focus on their competition, and that Don Cherry, having never participated in international athletic competition, does not have the right to be critical of Olympic athletes.

After winning five medals (more than any other Canadian at a Winter Games), Cindy Klassen accepted the selection as the flag bearer for the closing ceremonies.

== Other participation ==
As the host nation of the next Winter Games, Canada's role was to promote the 2010 Winter Olympics, its host city, its host province, and the country over the duration of these Games. Canada House was a log cabin constructed with Canadian pine wood and it was one of 12 nation's houses established in Turin. The pavilion opened its doors to the public on January 23, 2006, at piazza Valdo Fusi, in the city centre and would remain open until March 20 at the conclusion of the Paralympic Winter Games. Aside from showcasing Canadian culture, the building would host meetings for companies from British Columbia and Italy who would be interested to develop business partnerships. The building would be donated to the city of Turin and would be transferred to a new city park after the Games.

During the closing ceremonies of these Games, there was a brief segment in which Canada delivered a preview of the 2010 Games. This included a choreographed program featuring Avril Lavigne, raising of the Canadian flag, and singing of O Canada by opera star Ben Heppner, himself a B.C. native. The handover of the Games was highlighted by Vancouver mayor Sam Sullivan, a quadriplegic, accepting and waving the Olympic flag. Aside from the flag handed from the mayor of Turin Sergio Chiamparino, the City of Vancouver is now the custodian of the actual Olympic flag lowered at Stadio Olimpico during the closing ceremonies.

British Columbia Premier Gordon Campbell, himself a Vancouver native, and Governor General Michaëlle Jean attended the Games' competitions and closing ceremonies. They also availed themselves to the news media, sharing their thoughts about British Columbia and Canada welcoming the world in 2010. The federal government was represented by the attendance of Foreign Affairs Minister Peter MacKay at the closing ceremonies.

A number of Canadian citizens with dual citizenship have competed for other countries and served as their respective flag bearers:

- Dale Begg-Smith carried the flag of Australia during the closing ceremonies
- Tuğba Karademir carried the flag of Turkey during the opening ceremonies
- Mathieu Razanakolona carried the flag of Madagascar during the opening and closing ceremonies as the sole competitor of the country

In Ottawa, Prime Minister Stephen Harper said in a statement that the Olympic flame had begun the journey to Vancouver.

== Notes ==
- 2006 was the first year since 1988 that Canada had athletes competing in Nordic combined and the first since 1992 that Canada had athletes in ski jumping.
- While skiing in the final of the women's team sprint in cross-country skiing, Sara Renner broke her ski pole. Fortunately, a coach immediately handed her a new pole. It was later revealed that the coach was not from Canada, but from Norway. Sara Renner and her partner Beckie Scott went on to win a silver medal in the event. Ironically, the Norwegian team finished fourth, so people conclude that if not for the coach then perhaps it would have been Norway that won a medal and not Canada.
- Lascelles Brown, who previously competed for Jamaica, competed for Canada in bobsleigh. He would go on to win a silver medal in two-man bobsleigh with partner Pierre Lueders.

== Official outfitter ==
HBC became the official outfitter of clothing for members of the Canadian Olympic team and replacing Roots Canada. The same clothing was also sold at HBC stores in Canada. HBC had been the official outfitters for Canada's Winter teams in 1936, 1960, 1964 and 1968.
