= Ski jumping at the 2006 Winter Olympics – Large hill individual =

Men's large hill individual at the XX Olympic Winter Games
- Pictogram for ski jumping
- Venue: Pragelato
- Dates: February 17–18, 2006
- Competitors: 69 from 21 nations
- winning score: 276.9

Medalists
1st place, gold medalist(s)		Thomas Morgenstern; Austria
2nd place, silver medalist(s)		Andreas Kofler; Austria
3rd place, bronze medalist(s)		Lars Bystøl; Norway

The men's large hill individual ski jumping competition for the 2006 Winter Olympics was held in Pragelato, Italy. It began on 17 February, and concluded on 18 February.

== Results ==
=== Qualifying ===
Fifteen skiers were pre-qualified, on the basis of their World Cup performance, meaning that they directly advanced to the final round. These skiers still jumped in the qualifying round, but they were not included with non-pre-qualified skiers in the standings. The fifty-one skiers who were not pre-qualified competed for thirty-five spots in the final round.

Rank	Name	Country	Score	Notes
1	Noriaki Kasai	Japan	117.3	
2	Sigurd Pettersen	Norway	115.9	
3	Michael Neumayer	Germany	114.4	
4	Simon Ammann	Switzerland	111.7	
5	Dmitry Vassiliev	Russia	111.3	
6	Daiki Ito	Japan	110.9	
7	Jernej Damjan	Slovenia	105.9	
8	Martin Koch	Austria	100.8	
9	Dmitry Ipatov	Russia	98.1	
10	Risto Jussilainen	Finland	97.2	
11	Denis Kornilov	Russia	95.9	
12	Tami Kiuru	Finland	95.3	
13	Sebastian Colloredo	Italy	94.1	
14	Primož Peterka	Slovenia	93.1	
15	Martin Schmitt	Germany	92.1	
15	Ivan Karaulov	Kazakhstan	92.1	
17	Michael Möllinger	Switzerland	91.3	
18	Tsuyoshi Ichinohe	Japan	89.9	
19	Stefan Read	Canada	88.5	
20	Borek Sedlak	Czech Republic	86.8	
21	Radik Zhaparov	Kazakhstan	86.7	
21	Alan Alborn	United States	86.7	
23	Ildar Fatchullin	Russia	85.4	
23	Choi Heung-Chul	South Korea	85.4	
25	Nikolay Karpenko	Kazakhstan	84.6	
26	Rok Benkovič	Slovenia	84.5	
27	Kamil Stoch	Poland	83.0	
28	Jens Salumae	Estonia	80.3	
28	Robert Mateja	Poland	80.3	
30	Jan Matura	Czech Republic	79.5	
31	Ondřej Vaculík	Czech Republic	76.0	
32	Kim Hyun-Ki	South Korea	75.3	
33	Alessio Bolognani	Italy	74.9	
34	Guido Landert	Switzerland	74.4	
35	Graeme Gorham	Canada	69.4	
36	Maksim Anisimov	Belarus	68.6	
37	Martin Mesik	Slovakia	67.7	
38	Tian Zhongdan	China	67.4	
39	Clint Jones	United States	64.9	
40	Li Yang	China	64.8	
41	Alexey Korolev	Kazakhstan	63.5	
42	Tommy Schwall	United States	63.4	
43	Rafal Sliz	Poland	63.1	
44	Georgi Zharkov	Bulgaria	59.3	
45	Kang Chil Ku	South Korea	58.8	
46	Gregory Baxter	Canada	58.5	
47	Jim Denney	United States	53.5	
48	Jaan Jüris	Estonia	52.2	
49	Michael Nell	Canada	48.0	
50	Andrea Morassi	Italy	45.7	
51	Volodymyr Boschuk	Ukraine	30.6	
52	Petar Fartunov	Bulgaria	26.6	
53	Choi Yong-Jik	South Korea	22.8	
*	Thomas Morgenstern	Austria	136.8	
*	Janne Ahonen	Finland	136.3	
*	Andreas Kofler	Austria	133.8	
*	Andreas Kuettel	Switzerland	132.6	
*	Matti Hautamäki	Finland	129.6	
*	Lars Bystøl	Norway	129.2	
*	Takanobu Okabe	Japan	122.1	
*	Bjørn Einar Romøren	Norway	120.9	
*	Georg Späth	Germany	116.8	
*	Roar Ljøkelsøy	Norway	114.1	
*	Adam Małysz	Poland	114.0	
*	Jakub Janda	Czech Republic	112.7	
*	Robert Kranjec	Slovenia	106.7	
*	Michael Uhrmann	Germany	106.2	
*	Andreas Widhölzl	Austria	99.9	
DQ	Petr Chaadaev	Belarus	DSQ	

1: These skiers were pre-qualified; they did perform jumps in the qualification round, but were not ranked with the non-pre-qualified jumpers.

2: Chaadaev was disqualified because his skis were of improper length.

=== Final ===
The final consisted of two jumps, with the top thirty after the first jump qualifying for the second jump. The combined total of the two jumps was used to determine the final ranking.

Rank	Name	Country	Jump 1	Rank	Jump 2	Rank	Total
Gold medal	Thomas Morgenstern	Austria	131.4	2	145.5	1	276.9
Silver medal	Andreas Kofler	Austria	135.7	1	141.1	2	276.8
Bronze medal	Lars Bystøl	Norway	121.5	5	129.2	3	250.7
4	Roar Ljøkelsøy	Norway	127.8	3	115.0	14	242.8
5	Matti Hautamäki	Finland	117.3	7	125.1	4	242.4
6	Andreas Küttel	Switzerland	120.0	6	119.1	10	239.1
7	Bjørn Einar Romøren	Norway	121.8	4	116.4	12	238.2
8	Takanobu Okabe	Japan	115.0	8	121.8	7	236.8
9	Janne Ahonen	Finland	112.3	9	121.8	7	234.1
10	Jakub Janda	Czech Republic	108.6	13	121.9	6	230.5
11	Michael Neumayer	Germany	110.3	11	118.8	11	229.1
12	Noriaki Kasai	Japan	104.0	21	123.3	5	227.3
13	Michael Möllinger	Switzerland	104.9	19	120.0	9	224.9
14	Adam Małysz	Poland	111.4	10	111.3	17	222.7
15	Simon Ammann	Switzerland	104.4	20	113.6	16	218.0
16	Michael Uhrmann	Germany	106.3	17	108.6	18	214.9
17	Dmitry Vassiliev	Russia	99.4	24	114.8	15	214.2
18	Tami Kiuru	Finland	108.6	13	105.4	20	214.0
19	Martin Schmitt	Germany	97.2	27	115.4	13	212.6
20	Georg Späth	Germany	108.6	13	103.6	23	212.2
21	Andreas Widhölzl	Austria	109.9	12	100.2	24	210.1
22	Jan Matura	Czech Republic	96.7	29	107.7	19	204.4
23	Jens Salumäe	Estonia	99.4	24	104.4	21	203.8
24	Sigurd Pettersen	Norway	106.3	17	96.2	26	202.5
25	Tsuyoshi Ichinohe	Japan	108.5	16	93.9	28	202.4
26	Kamil Stoch	Poland	96.2	30	103.8	22	200.0
27	Dmitry Ipatov	Russia	99.9	22	97.2	25	197.1
28	Jernej Damjan	Slovenia	97.2	27	95.0	27	192.2
29	Rok Benkovič	Slovenia	99.9	22	90.4	29	190.3
30	Stefan Read	Canada	98.8	26	89.4	30	188.2
31	Radik Zhaparov	Kazakhstan	95.7	31	—	—	—
32	Martin Koch	Austria	94.8	32	—	—	—
33	Denis Kornilov	Russia	94.0	33	—	—	—
34	Primož Peterka	Slovenia	92.0	34	—	—	—
35	Risto Jussilainen	Finland	91.7	35	—	—	—
36	Sebastian Colloredo	Italy	90.2	36	—	—	—
37	Guido Landert	Switzerland	85.3	37	—	—	—
38	Robert Mateja	Poland	84.8	38	—	—	—
39	Kim Hyun-Ki	South Korea	84.4	39	—	—	—
40	Borek Sedlák	Czech Republic	83.0	40	—	—	—
41	Ildar Fatchullin	Russia	82.6	41	—	—	—
42	Daiki Ito	Japan	82.5	42	—	—	—
43	Alan Alborn	United States	79.9	43	—	—	—
44	Alessio Bolognani	Italy	70.7	44	—	—	—
45	Ondřej Vaculík	Czech Republic	70.1	45	—	—	—
46	Ivan Karaulov	Kazakhstan	68.9	46	—	—	—
47	Choi Heung-Chul	South Korea	65.3	47	—	—	—
48	Nikolay Karpenko	Kazakhstan	65.2	48	—	—	—
49	Robert Kranjec	Slovenia	63.1	49	—	—	—
50	Graeme Gorham	Canada	61.1	50	—	—	—
