= Biathlon at the 2006 Winter Olympics – Women's relay =

Women's biathlon relay at the XX Olympic Winter Games
- Venue: Cesana San Sicario
- Dates: 23 February 2006
- Competitors: 72 from 18 nations
- Winning time: 1:16:12.5

Medalists
1st place, gold medalist(s)		Anna Bogaliy; Svetlana Ishmouratova; Olga Zaitseva; Albina Akhatova	Russia
2nd place, silver medalist(s)		Martina Glagow; Andrea Henkel; Katrin Apel; Kati Wilhelm	Germany
3rd place, bronze medalist(s)		Delphyne Peretto; Florence Baverel-Robert; Sylvie Becaert; Sandrine Bailly	France

The Women's 4 × 6 kilometre biathlon relay competition at the 2006 Winter Olympics in Turin, Italy was held on 23 February, at Cesana San Sicario. Each national team consisted of four members, with each skiing 6 kilometres and shooting twice, once prone and once standing.

== Summary ==
At each shooting station, a competitor has eight shots to hit five targets; however, only five bullets are loaded in a magazine at one - if additional shots are required, the spare bullets must be loaded one at a time. If after the eight shots are taken, there are still targets not yet hit, the competitor must ski a 150-metre penalty loop.

Germany won the relay event at the 2002 Winter Olympics, while Russia's women were the defending World Champions after beating Germany by 41.4 seconds at the 2005 World Championship; Russia also led the World Cup standings after four relay events.

Despite missing the veteran Olga Pyleva, suspended for two years after failing an anti-doping test the previous week, the Russian team led from start to finish. The Germans finished 50.7 seconds behind for the silver. The French team took the bronze.

== Results ==
The race was held at 12:00.

Rank	Bib	Team	Time	Penalties (P+S)	Deficit
1st place, gold medalist(s)	1	Russia; Anna Bogaliy; Svetlana Ishmouratova; Olga Zaitseva; Albina Akhatova	1:16:12.5; 19:06.3; 18:56.2; 19:06.8; 19:03.2	0+1 0+1; 0+0 0+1; 0+1 0+0; 0+0 0+0; 0+0 0+0	–
2nd place, silver medalist(s)	2	Germany; Martina Glagow; Andrea Henkel; Katrin Apel; Kati Wilhelm	1:17:03.2; 19:18.8; 19:15.9; 19:45.5; 18:43.0	0+3 1+5; 0+1 0+2; 0+2 0+0; 0+0 1+3; 0+0 0+0	+50.7
3rd place, bronze medalist(s)	4	France; Delphyne Peretto; Florence Baverel-Robert; Sylvie Becaert; Sandrine Bailly	1:18:38.7; 20:46.5; 19:02.6; 19:50.2; 18:59.4	0+6 0+2; 0+2 0+1; 0+1 0+0; 0+1 0+1; 0+2 0+0	+2:26.2
4	6	Belarus; Ekaterina Ivanova; Olga Nazarova; Lyudmila Ananko; Olena Zubrilova	1:19:19.6; 19:33.0; 19:45.8; 19:53.9; 20:06.9	0+5 0+3; 0+2 0+0; 0+2 0+2; 0+0 0+1; 0+1 0+0	+3:07.1
5	3	Norway; Tora Berger; Liv Grete Poirée; Gunn Margit Andreassen; Linda Tjørhom	1:19:34.4; 20:28.1; 18:43.2; 20:32.0; 19:51.1	1+6 0+7; 1+3 0+1; 0+1 0+1; 0+0 0+3; 0+2 0+2	+3:21.9
6	5	Slovenia; Teja Gregorin; Andreja Mali; Dijana Grudiček; Tadeja Brankovič	1:19:55.7; 19:45.2; 20:09.8; 19:44.5; 20:16.2	0+5 1+6; 0+0 0+0; 0+0 0+1; 0+2 0+2; 0+3 1+3	+3:43.2
7	11	Poland; Krystyna Pałka; Magdalena Gwizdoń; Katarzyna Ponikwia; Magdalena Grzywa	1:20:29.3; 20:11.1; 19:39.3; 20:15.5; 20:23.4	0+4 0+4; 0+2 0+1; 0+1 0+2; 0+1 0+1; 0+0 0+0	+4:16.8
8	9	Bulgaria; Pavlina Filipova; Radka Popova; Irina Nikulchina; Ekaterina Dafovska	1:20:38.7; 19:17.7; 20:43.1; 20:27.2; 20:10.7	0+5 3+9; 0+0 0+0; 0+0 1+3; 0+3 1+3; 0+2 1+3	+4:26.2
9	7	China; Kong Yingchao; Sun Ribo; Yin Qiao; Liu Xianying	1:21:43.7; 19:51.1; 20:41.5; 20:55.3; 20:15.8	0+5 2+8; 0+0 0+0; 0+2 1+3; 0+1 1+3; 0+2 0+2	+5:31.2
10	12	Slovakia; Anna Murínová; Marcela Pavkovčeková; Martina Halinárová; Soňa Mihoková	1:21:55.5; 21:09.2; 20:12.2; 20:35.4; 19:58.7	0+2 0+8; 0+0 0+2; 0+0 0+3; 0+0 0+1; 0+2 0+2	+5:43.0
11	8	Ukraine; Oksana Khvostenko; Olena Petrova; Nina Lemesh; Lilia Efremova	1:21:55.5; 20:14.2; 19:36.7; 21:37.5; 20:27.1	3+7 0+7; 0+0 0+0; 0+1 0+1; 2+3 0+3; 1+3 0+3	+5:43.0
12	15	Italy; Michela Ponza; Saskia Santer; Nathalie Santer; Barbara Ertl	1:22:42.7; 19:22.7; 20:38.3; 22:01.1; 20:40.6	0+4 3+5; 0+1 0+0; 0+2 0+2; 0+0 3+3; 0+1 0+0	+6:30.2
13	10	Czech Republic; Kateřina Holubcová; Lenka Faltusová; Magda Rezlerová; Zdeňka Vejnarová	1:24:14.8; 20:47.3; 20:34.8; 21:23.6; 21:29.1	0+5 1+7; 0+1 0+0; 0+0 0+1; 0+3 0+3; 0+1 1+3	+8:02.3
14	16	Romania; Dana Plotogea; Éva Tófalvi; Mihaela Purdea; Alexandra Rusu	1:25:13.3; 21:26.7; 19:38.1; 22:09.8; 21:58.7	1+8 2+10; 0+3 0+3; 0+0 0+3; 0+2 2+3; 1+3 0+1	+9:00.8
15	18	United States; Rachel Steer; Tracy Barnes; Lanny Barnes; Carolyn Treacy	1:25:20.3; 20:31.1; 22:07.0; 21:21.7; 21:20.5	0+5 0+6; 0+1 0+3; 0+2 0+0; 0+1 0+1; 0+1 0+2	+9:07.8
16	14	Japan; Tomomi Otaka; Kanae Meguro; Tamami Tanaka; Ikuyo Tsukidate	1:26:09.0; 23:21.2; 19:58.5; 21:21.3; 21:28.0	0+5 4+9; 0+2 2+3; 0+2 0+0; 0+1 1+3; 0+0 1+3	+9:56.5
17	13	Canada; Zina Kocher; Sandra Keith; Martine Albert; Marie-Pierre Parent	1:26:09.7; 20:24.3; 21:32.8; 21:25.2; 22:47.4	0+1 1+9; 0+0 0+1; 0+0 0+3; 0+0 0+2; 0+1 1+3	+9:57.2
18	17	Latvia; Madara Līduma; Anžela Brice; Linda Savļaka; Gerda Krūmiņa	1:26:21.3; 19:35.8; 20:57.9; 22:07.3; 23:40.3	0+5 2+6; 0+1 0+2; 0+0 0+1; 0+1 0+0; 0+3 2+3	+10:08.8
