= Poland at the 2006 Winter Olympics =

- IOC code: POL
- NOC: Polish Olympic Committee
- Website: www.pkol.pl (in Polish)

in Turin
- Competitors: 45 (28 men, 17 women) in 11 sports
- Flag bearers: Paulina Ligocka (opening); Tomasz Sikora (closing)
- Medals Ranked 20th: Gold 0 Silver 1 Bronze 1 Total 2

Winter Olympics appearances (overview)
- 1924; 1928; 1932; 1936; 1948; 1952; 1956; 1960; 1964; 1968; 1972; 1976; 1980; 1984; 1988; 1992; 1994; 1998; 2002; 2006; 2010; 2014; 2018; 2022; 2026

Poland competed at the 2006 Winter Olympics in Turin, Italy.

Poland sent 45 athletes to the 2006 Winter Olympic Games, and snowboarder Paulina Ligocka was the flag bearer at the opening ceremonies, while biathlete Tomasz Sikora was the flag bearer at the closing ceremonies.

== Medalists ==
| Medal | Name | Sport | Event | Date |
|---|---|---|---|---|
| Silver | Tomasz Sikora | Biathlon | Men's mass start | 25 February |
| Bronze | Justyna Kowalczyk | Cross-country skiing | Women's 30 km freestyle | 24 February |

== Alpine skiing ==
| Athlete | Event | Final | | | | |
| Athlete | Event | Run 1 | Run 2 | Run 3 | Total | Rank |
|---|---|---|---|---|---|---|
| Michał Kałwa | Men's downhill | n/a | | | 1:56.81 | 44 |
| Michał Kałwa | Men's super-G | n/a | | | 1:36.25 | 45 |
| Michał Kałwa | Men's slalom | 59.82 | did not finish | | | |
| Michał Kałwa | Men's combined | 1:42.72 | did not finish | | | |
| Dagmara Krzyżynska | Women's giant slalom | 1:03.86 | 1:12.05 | n/a | 2:15.91 | 25 |
| Katarzyna Karasińska | Women's slalom | 45.41 | 48.89 | n/a | 1:34.30 | 30 |

Note: In the men's combined, run 1 is the downhill, and runs 2 and 3 are the slalom. In the women's combined, runs 1 and 2 are the slalom, and run 3 the downhill.

== Biathlon ==
Men

| Athlete | Event | Final | | |
| Athlete | Event | Time | Misses | Rank |
|---|---|---|---|---|
| Grzegorz Bodziana | Sprint | 30:08.4 | 1 | 68 |
| Grzegorz Bodziana | Individual | 1:03:39.6 | 5 | 72 |
| Michał Piecha | Sprint | 30:08.4 | 2 | 64 |
| Krzysztof Pływaczyk | Individual | 1:04:12.9 | 4 | 75 |
| Tomasz Sikora | Sprint | 27:54.3 | 2 | 19 |
| Tomasz Sikora | Pursuit | 37:31.61 | 6 | 18 |
| Tomasz Sikora | Mass start | 47:26.3 | 1 | Silver medal |
| Tomasz Sikora | Individual | 57:22.1 | 3 | 21 |
| Wiesław Ziemianin | Sprint | 28:10.1 | 0 | 25 |
| Wiesław Ziemianin | Pursuit | 38:42.36 | 1 | 28 |
| Wiesław Ziemianin | Individual | 1:01:16.0 | 4 | 53 |
| Wiesław Ziemianin; Tomasz Sikora; Michał Piecha; Krzysztof Pływaczyk | Relay | 1:26:57.0 | 12 | 13 |

Women

| Athlete | Event | Final | | |
| Athlete | Event | Time | Misses | Rank |
|---|---|---|---|---|
| Magdalena Grzywa | Individual | 1:00:41.3 | 7 | 71 |
| Magdalena Gwizdoń | Sprint | 23:54.7 | 1 | 20 |
| Magdalena Gwizdoń | Pursuit | 41:12.62 | 4 | 21 |
| Magdalena Gwizdoń | Mass start | 45:59.5 | 5 | 29 |
| Magdalena Gwizdoń | Individual | 55:17.5 | 4 | 33 |
| Magdalena Nykiel | Sprint | 25:32.2 | 1 | 56 |
| Magdalena Nykiel | Pursuit | Lapped | | |
| Krystyna Pałka | Sprint | 24:07.3 | 1 | 25 |
| Krystyna Pałka | Pursuit | 43:26.56 | 6 | 37 |
| Krystyna Pałka | Mass start | 46:31.5 | 3 | 30 |
| Krystyna Pałka | Individual | 51:50.7 | 0 | 5 |
| Katarzyna Ponikwia | Sprint | 26:17.3 | 1 | 63 |
| Katarzyna Ponikwia | Individual | 57:32.7 | 4 | 56 |
| Krystyna Pałka; Magdalena Gwizdoń; Katarzyna Ponikwia; Magdalena Grzywa | Relay | 1:20:29.3 | 8 | 7 |

== Bobsleigh ==
| Athlete | Event | Final | | | | | |
| Athlete | Event | Run 1 | Run 2 | Run 3 | Run 4 | Total | Rank |
|---|---|---|---|---|---|---|---|
| Dawid Kupczyk; Michał Zblewski; Mariusz Latkowski; Marcin Płacheta | Four-man | 55.89 | 55.79 | 55.85 | 55.49 | 3:43.02 | 15 |

== Cross-country skiing ==
Distance

| Athlete | Event | Final | |
| Athlete | Event | Total | Rank |
|---|---|---|---|
| Justyna Kowalczyk | Women's 10 km classical | Did not finish | |
| Justyna Kowalczyk | Women's 15 km pursuit | 43:25.6 | 8 |
| Justyna Kowalczyk | Women's 30 km freestyle | 1:22:27.5 | Bronze medal |
| Janusz Krężelok | Men's 15 km classical | 40:24.5 | 26 |

Sprint

| Athlete | Event | Qualifying | | Quarterfinal | | Semifinal | | Final | |
| Athlete | Event | Total | Rank | Total | Rank | Total | Rank | Total | Rank |
|---|---|---|---|---|---|---|---|---|---|
| Justyna Kowalczyk | Women's sprint | 2:21.19 | 44 | Did not advance | | | | | 44 |
| Maciej Kreczmer | Men's sprint | 2:20.83 | 33 | Did not advance | | | | | 33 |
| Janusz Krężelok | Men's sprint | 2:20.04 | 23 Q | 2:21.6 | 4 | Did not advance | | | 19 |
| Maciej Kreczmer; Janusz Krężelok | Men's team sprint | n/a | | | | 17:27.1 | 5 Q | 17:26.3 | 7 |

== Figure skating ==
| Athlete | Event | CD | | SP/OD | | FS/FD | | Total | |
| Athlete | Event | Points | Rank | Points | Rank | Points | Rank | Points | Rank |
|---|---|---|---|---|---|---|---|---|---|
| Dorota Zagórska; Mariusz Siudek | Pairs | n/a | | 56.10 | 9 | 109.85 | 8 | 165.95 | 9 |
| Aleksandra Kauc; Michał Zych | Ice dance | 24.93 | 21 | 42.06 | 22 | 69.61 | 22 | 136.60 | 21 |

Key: CD = Compulsory Dance, FD = Free Dance, FS = Free Skate, OD = Original Dance, SP = Short Program

== Luge ==
| Athlete | Event | Final | | | | | |
| Athlete | Event | Run 1 | Run 2 | Run 3 | Run 4 | Total | Rank |
|---|---|---|---|---|---|---|---|
| Ewelina Staszulonek | Women's singles | 48.653 | 47.666 | 48.293 | 47.567 | 3:12.179 | 15 |
| Krzysztof Lipiński; Marcin Piekarski | Doubles | 49.829 | 48.616 | n/a | | 1:38.445 | 17 |

== Short track speed skating ==
| Athlete | Event | Heat | | Quarterfinal | | Semifinal | | Final | |
| Athlete | Event | Time | Rank | Time | Rank | Time | Rank | Time | Rank |
|---|---|---|---|---|---|---|---|---|---|
| Dariusz Kulesza | Men's 500 m | 43.416 | 2 Q | disqualified | | | | | |
| Dariusz Kulesza | Men's 1000 m | 1:29.102 | 2 Q | 1:30.556 | 4 | did not advance | | | 11 |
| Dariusz Kulesza | Men's 1500 m | 2:24.118 | 5 | did not advance | | | | | 22 |

== Skeleton ==
| Athlete | Event | Final | | | |
| Athlete | Event | Run 1 | Run 2 | Total | Rank |
|---|---|---|---|---|---|
| Monika Wołowiec | Women's | 1:02.31 | 1:02.99 | 2:05.30 | 15 |

== Ski jumping ==
| Athlete | Event | Qualifying | | First round | | Final | | |
| Athlete | Event | Points | Rank | Points | Rank | Points | Total | Rank |
|---|---|---|---|---|---|---|---|---|
| Stefan Hula | Normal hill | 110.5 | 24 Q | 115.5 | 27 Q | 102.5 | 218.0 | 29 |
| Adam Małysz | Normal hill | 130.5 | 4 PQ | 130.0 | 8 Q | 131.0 | 261.0 | 7 |
| Adam Małysz | Large hill | 114.1 | 11 PQ | 111.4 | 10 Q | 111.3 | 222.7 | 14 |
| Robert Mateja | Normal hill | 127.0 | 4 Q | 115.0 | 28 Q | 114.0 | 229.0 | 25 |
| Robert Mateja | Large hill | 80.3 | 28 Q | 84.8 | 38 | did not advance | | 38 |
| Rafał Śliż | Large hill | 63.1 | 43 | did not advance | | | | 43 |
| Kamil Stoch | Normal hill | 122.5 | 11 Q | 125.5 | 15 Q | 121.5 | 247.0 | 16 |
| Kamil Stoch | Large hill | 83.0 | 27 Q | 96.2 | 30 Q | 103.8 | 200.0 | 26 |
| Stefan Hula; Adam Małysz; Robert Mateja; Kamil Stoch | Team | n/a | | 445.2 | 5 Q | 449.2 | 894.4 | 5 |

Note: PQ indicates a skier was pre-qualified for the final, based on entry rankings.

== Snowboarding ==
Halfpipe

| Athlete | Event | Qualifying run 1 | | Qualifying run 2 | | Final | | |
| Athlete | Event | Points | Rank | Points | Rank | Run 1 | Run 2 | Rank |
|---|---|---|---|---|---|---|---|---|
| Paulina Ligocka | Women's halfpipe | 31.8 | 11 | 31.8 | 11 | did not advance | | 17 |
| Mateusz Ligocki | Men's halfpipe | 11.6 | 38 | 4.0 | 38 | did not advance | | 44 |
| Michał Ligocki | Men's halfpipe | 11.3 | 40 | 26.9 | 23 | did not advance | | 29 |

Note: In the final, the single best score from two runs is used to determine the ranking. A bracketed score indicates a run that wasn't counted.

Parallel GS

| Athlete | Event | Qualification | | Round of 16 | Quarterfinals | Semifinals | Finals | |
| Athlete | Event | Time | Rank | Opposition Time | Opposition Time | Opposition Time | Opposition Time | Rank |
|---|---|---|---|---|---|---|---|---|
| Blanka Isielonis | Women's parallel giant slalom | 1:25.87 | 27 | did not advance | | | | 27 |
| Jagna Marczułajtis | Women's parallel giant slalom | 1:23.12 | 17 | did not advance | | | | 17 |

Key: '+ Time' represents a deficit; the brackets indicate the results of each run.

Snowboard Cross

| Athlete | Event | Qualifying | | 1/8 finals | Quarterfinals | Semifinals | Finals | |
| Athlete | Event | Time | Rank | Position | Position | Position | Position | Rank |
|---|---|---|---|---|---|---|---|---|
| Mateusz Ligocki | Men's snowboard cross | 1:21.81 | 13 Q | 4 | did not advance | | | 20 |
| Rafał Skarbek-Malczewski | Men's snowboard cross | 1:22.07 | 16 Q | 4 | did not advance | | | 22 |

== Speed skating ==
| Athlete | Event | Race 1 | | Final | |
| Athlete | Event | Time | Rank | Time | Rank |
|---|---|---|---|---|---|
| Konrad Niedźwiedzki | Men's 1000 m | n/a | | 1:09.95 | 13 |
| Konrad Niedźwiedzki | Men's 1500 m | n/a | | 1:48.09 | 12 |
| Maciej Ustynowicz | Men's 500 m | 36.09 | 51.92 | 1:28.01 | 36 |
| Maciej Ustynowicz | Men's 1000 m | disqualified | | | |
| Artur Waś | Men's 500 m | 36.43 | 36.61 | 1:13.04 | 32 |
| Katarzyna Wójcicka | Women's 1000 m | n/a | | 1:17.28 | 8 |
| Katarzyna Wójcicka | Women's 1500 m | n/a | | 1:59.96 | 11 |
| Katarzyna Wójcicka | Women's 3000 m | n/a | | 4:09.61 | 10 |
| Katarzyna Wójcicka | Women's 5000 m | n/a | | 7:28.09 | 16 |
| Paweł Zygmunt | Men's 5000 m | n/a | | 6:35.01 | 18 |
