= Speed skating at the 2006 Winter Olympics – Women's 5000 metres =

Women's 5000 metres at the XX Olympic Winter Games
- Venue: Oval Lingotto
- Dates: 25 February 2006
- Competitors: 16 from 10 nations
- Winning time: 6:59.07

Medalists
1st place, gold medalist(s)		Clara Hughes; Canada
2nd place, silver medalist(s)		Claudia Pechstein; Germany
3rd place, bronze medalist(s)		Cindy Klassen; Canada

The women's 5000 m speed skating competition at the 2006 Winter Olympics in Turin, Italy, was held on 25 February.

== Records ==
Prior to this competition, the existing world and Olympic records were as follows.

World record	Claudia Pechstein (GER)	6:46.91	Salt Lake City, United States	23 February 2002
Olympic record	Claudia Pechstein (GER)	6:46.91	Salt Lake City, United States	23 February 2002

No new world or Olympic records were set during the competition.

== Results ==
Rank	Pair	Lane	Name	Country	Time	Time behind	Notes
Gold medal	8	O	Clara Hughes	Canada	6:59.07		
Silver medal	8	I	Claudia Pechstein	Germany	7:00.08	+1.01	
Bronze medal	7	O	Cindy Klassen	Canada	7:00.57	+1.50	
4	7	I	Martina Sáblíková	Czech Republic	7:01.38	+2.31	
5	6	O	Daniela Anschütz	Germany	7:02.82	+3.75	
6	4	O	Kristina Groves	Canada	7:03.95	+4.88	
7	5	I	Catherine Raney	United States	7:04.91	+5.84	
8	5	O	Maren Haugli	Norway	7:06.08	+7.01	
9	4	I	Renate Groenewold	Netherlands	7:11.32	+12.25	
10	6	I	Carien Kleibeuker	Netherlands	7:12.18	+13.11	
11	3	O	Eriko Ishino	Japan	7:12.48	+13.41	
12	2	I	Anna Natalia Rokita	Austria	7:16.75	+17.68	
13	1	I	Maki Tabata	Japan	7:18.05	+18.98	
14	2	I	Lucille Opitz	Germany	7:18.06	+18.99	
15	3	I	Wang Fei	China	7:22.90	+23.83	
16	1	O	Katarzyna Wojcicka	Poland	7:28.09	+29.02	

Lap times for the medal winners, shown graphically
