= Petra Starčević =

Croatian biathlete (born 1987)

Personal information
- Full name: Petra Starčević
- Born: 7 May 1987 (age 39) Rijeka, Croatia
- Height: 1.60 m (5 ft 3 in)

Sport
- Sport: Skiing

World Cup career
- Indiv. podiums: 0
- Indiv. wins: 0
- Updated on 19 August 2012

Petra Starčević (born 7 May 1987 in Rijeka) is a retired Croatian biathlete. At the 2006 Winter Olympics in Turin she finished 79th at the 2006 Winter Olympics sprint event and 79th in the individual event.
