= Alexandra Stoian =

Romanian biathlete (born 1983)

Personal information
- Born: 5 August 1983 (age 42) Bran, Brașov, Romania

Sport

Professional information
- Sport: Biathlon

Olympic Games
- Teams: 3 (2002, 2006, 2010)

Alexandra Stoian (born 5 August 1983 in Bran, Brașov), previously Alexandra Rusu, is a Romanian biathlete.

== Career ==
Stoian competed in the 2002, 2006 and 2010 Winter Olympics for Romania. Her best finish was 14th, as part of the 2006 Romanian women's relay team. Her best individual placing was 45th, in the sprint. In 2002, she finished 72nd in the sprint. In 2006, she also finished 68th in the individual, and did not finish in the pursuit. In 2010, she finished 85th in the sprint.

As of February 2013, her best performance at the Biathlon World Championships is 8th, as part of the Romanian women's relay team, in 2009. Her best individual result at the Biathlon World Championships is 29th, in the 2009 sprint.

As of February 2013, Stoian's best result at a Biathlon World Cup event is 6th, with the Italian women's relay team at Ruhpolding in 2007/08. Her best individual performance in a Biathlon World Cup event is 24th, in the sprint at Pokljuka in 2009/10. Her best overall finish in the Biathlon World Cup is 84th, in 2009/10.
