= Dominique Vallee =

Canadian snowboarder

Personal information
- Born: April 9, 1981 (age 45) Montreal, Quebec, Canada
Medal record
Representing Canada
Women's snowboarding
FIS Snowboarding World Championships
Bronze medal – third place	2001 Madonna di Campiglio	Snowboard Cross

Dominique Vallee (born April 9, 1981) is a Canadian snowboarder, specializing in the halfpipe and snowboard cross events.

== Career ==
Vallee made her World Cup debut in January 1999 at Mont-Sainte-Anne, Canada, IN A halfpipe competition. She made her first World Cup podium in December 2001 when she won bronze in Whistler.

To date, Vallee has only a single World Cup medal, and her best World Cup season was 2003, when she placed 13th in the overall snowboard standings. She has also won a bronze medal in snowboard cross at the FIS Snowboarding World Championships, in 2001.

Vallee competed at the 2006 Winter Olympics, in both the halfpipe and snowboard cross. She finished 21st overall in the halfpipe and 19th in the qualifying round of the snowboard cross, with neither result allowing her to advance.

== World Cup podiums ==
Date	Location	Rank
December 9, 2001	Whistler	3rd place, bronze medalist(s)
