= Sean Crooks =

Canadian cross-country skier

Personal information
- Born: July 8, 1983 (age 42) Thunder Bay, Ontario, Canada
- Height: 175 cm (5 ft 9 in)

Sport
- Sport: Skiing

Sean Crooks (born July 8, 1983 in Thunder Bay, Ontario) is a Canadian cross-country skier.

As a junior, Crooks won the 2002 Canadian national sprint championships and in 2003 was the overall junior Canadian champion. In 2003, he competed in the Canada Winter Games in New Brunswick where he claimed gold in the sprint event. He competed in the 2002 and 2003 World Junior Ski Championships in Schonach, Germany and Solleftea, Sweden respectively. In the 2003 World Junior Ski Championships, his 11th place finish in the sprints was the best ever at the time by a Canadian male. Crooks made his World Cup debut in 2005, placing 28th in his first World Cup start in Vernon, BC. Later that season he teamed with Phil Widmer to finish 13th in World Cup team sprint at Canmore. His best individual World Cup performances came in 2007, when he placed 13th in the sprint points at the FIS Tour De Ski World Cup. In 2008 he placed 21st in World Cup sprint events at Davos and Canmore. In 2009, he placed 15th in the Whistler pre-Olympic World Cup classic sprint. In 2010 he placed 26th in World Cup sprint events in Rybinsk, Russia and Canmore, Canada. He won two Canadian Sprint titles in 2005 and 2009 and represented Canada in the 2007 World Championships in Sapporo, Japan and 2009 in Liberec, Czech Republic.

Crooks competed in two events at the 2006 Olympics in Turin. He finished 32nd in the qualifying portion of the sprint, and also was a part of the Canadian team in the relay, which finished 11th. Crooks retired in 2010 after a 7-year career as a member of the Canadian National Team. He completed a B.Sc. Kin (Hon) in 2014 at the University of Calgary. In 2015, Crooks began Medical School at the University of Calgary.

Crooks began his residency in Emergency Medicine at the University of Calgary in 2018.
