= Radka Popova =

Bulgarian biathlete (born 1974)

Personal information
- Nationality: Bulgarian
- Born: 26 January 1974 (age 52) Sapareva Banya, Kyustendil, Bulgaria
- Height: 1.67 m (5 ft 6 in)
- Weight: 62 kg (137 lb)

Sport
- Sport: Biathlon
- Club: Slavia Sofia

Radka Popova (Bulgarian: Радка Попова, born 26 January 1974) is a Bulgarian biathlete. She competed at the 1998 Winter Olympics and the 2006 Winter Olympics.

Her best Olympic result was eighth place in the women's 4 × 6 km relay at the 2006 Winter Olympics.
