= Michał Piecha =

Polish biathlete (born 1979)

Personal information
- Nationality: Polish
- Born: 31 March 1979 (age 46); Rybnik, Poland

Sport
- Sport: Biathlon

Michał Piecha (born 31 March 1979) is a Polish biathlete. He competed in the men's sprint event at the 2006 Winter Olympics.
