= Michael Nell =

Canadian ski jumper

Michael Nell (born February 5, 1984) is a Canadian former ski jumper.

Born in Calgary, Alberta, Nell started ski jumping in 1999 at almost 15 years old (in a sport where the common starting age is as young as 5–6 years old). He improved rapidly, being named to the National development team after only two years of Ski Jumping, and to the Canadian National Team just a year later. He competed with the Canadian National team for three years before taking a year hiatus to pursue academics. Nell was back on the National team for two more years from 2004 to 2006 after hearing that Canada would field its first Olympic Ski Jumping team since 1992 at the 2006 Olympic Winter Games in Torino, Italy.

Nell never competed at the World Cup or World Championships but his best individual result came in the Continental Cup where he finished 6th in the normal hill competition in Calgary in September 2002. He also showed good results at the Junior World Championships in Schonach, Germany in 2002. Nell's late start in the sport meant that though many of the other competitors were several years younger he was likely one of the least experienced. At the age of 17, it would be Nell's last chance to compete at the Junior World Championships.

Nell finished off his competitive career after competing at the 2006 Winter Olympics, in all three of the Ski Jumping events. He placed 64th and 65th, respectively, in the qualifying rounds of the normal and large hill individual events. He was also part of the Canadian foursome that finished 15th in the team event.

After retiring from the sport Nell returned to school, studying mechanical engineering at the University of Victoria in Victoria, BC. He graduated in 2011 and is now working towards his Professional Engineering designation.
