= Tian Zhandong =

Chinese ski jumper

Personal information
- Nationality: Chinese
- Born: 13 April 1983 (age 43) Tonghua, China

Sport
- Sport: Ski jumping

Tian Zhandong (Chinese: 田占东; born 13 April 1983) is a Chinese ski jumper. He competed in the normal hill and large hill events at the 2006 Winter Olympics.
