= Petar Fartunov =

Bulgarian ski jumper (born 1989)

Petar Fartunov (Bulgarian: Петър Фъртунов) (born 3 June 1989 in Samokov) is a Bulgarian ski jumper. His personal best is 175 metres from Planica 2009. He has also competed in the 2006 Winter Olympics.
