= Carolyn Treacy Bramante =

American biathlete (born 1982)

Personal information
- Nationality: American
- Born: 19 March 1982 (age 44)

Sport
- Sport: Biathlon
Medal record
Women's biathlon
Representing United States
Junior World Championships
Silver medal – second place	2002 Ridnaun	3 × 7.5 km relay

Carolyn Treacy Bramante (born March 19, 1982) is an athlete from Duluth, Minnesota, USA. She was a member of the U.S. 2006 Winter Olympics biathlon team. She attended Dartmouth College where she earned her undergraduate degree in sociology.

== 2006 Winter Olympics results ==
In February 2006, Bramante competed in the 2006 Winter Olympics in Turin, Italy. Individually, she placed 80th in the Women's 7.5 km Sprint finals, with a time of 28:18:4. She was a member of the U.S. Women's 4x6 km Relay team, which placed 15th with a time of 1 hour, 25.20.3 minutes. She anchored the team to their best finish ever.,

== Medical school ==
Bramante is a graduate of the University of Minnesota Medical School. She founded Interprofessional Street Outreach Program (iSTOP) to bring health care to underserved populations around the Twin Cities (Minneapolis–Saint Paul).

She completed a combined residency in internal medicine and pediatrics at the Johns Hopkins Hospital. She currently is an assistant professor at the University of Minnesota, where she is triple board certified in internal medicine, pediatrics, and obesity medicine.

== Family ==
She is married to Anthony Bramante, they met in college at Dartmouth.
