= Marie-Pierre Parent =

Canadian biathlete

Marie-Pierre Parent (born May 15, 1982) is a Canadian biathlete.

Born in Joliette, Quebec, Parent began competing in the biathlon in 1998, and joined the national team in 2003. Her best showing on the World Cup circuit came in 2004/05, when she finished 54th in Oslo. She has participated in three Biathlon World Championships, with her top individual finish a 63rd place in 2007.

Parent competed in three events at the 2006 Olympics in Turin. Her best individual showing was in the 7.5 kilometre sprint, where she was 76th, and she also raced in the Canadian relay team, ending up 17th in that race.
