= Martine Albert =

Canadian biathlete

Martine Albert (born September 17, 1973 in Rimouski, Quebec) is a Canadian biathlete.

Albert began competing in the biathlon in 1993, and had her most successful World Cup seasons in the late 90s, including her highest career finishes in World Cup events; 13th in races in Oslo and Pokljuka. She participated in eight Biathlon World Championships between 1995 and 2005, with her best showing coming in 1998, when she finished 23rd in the pursuit race in Pokljuka.

Albert competed in three events at the 2006 Olympics in Turin. Her best individual showing was in the 15 kilometre individual, and she also raced in the Canadian relay team, ending up 17th in that race.
