= Verónica Isbej =

Chilean biathlete (born 1976)

Personal information
- Nationality: Chilean
- Born: 17 November 1976 (age 48)

Sport
- Sport: Biathlon

Verónica Isbej (born 17 November 1976) is a Chilean biathlete. She competed in two events at the 2006 Winter Olympics.
