= Magdalena Nykiel =

Polish biathlete (born 1983)

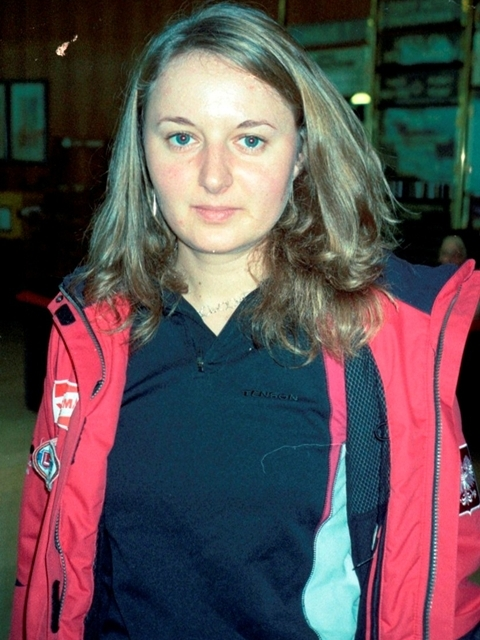

Personal information
- Nationality: Polish
- Born: 25 March 1983 (age 42); Kowary, Poland

Sport
- Sport: Biathlon

Magdalena Nykiel (born 25 March 1983) is a Polish biathlete. She competed in two events at the 2006 Winter Olympics.
