= Emma Fowler =

British biathlete

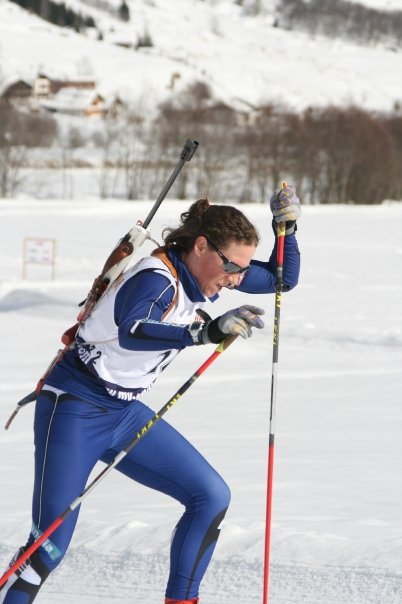
Fowler in 2009.

Corporal Emma Fowler (born 5 June 1979) is a British biathlete who in 2006 became the first British female biathlete to compete at the Winter Olympics. She has been a member of the Royal Logistic Corps, and is from Taunton, Somerset.

== Career ==
Fowler began competing in biathlon in 1997, and made her international debut in 1998. She qualified to compete in the 2006 Winter Olympics in Turin, becoming the first female British biathlete to do so. She finished 78th in the 15 km individual event, and 67th in the 7.5 km sprint event. She competed at the Biathlon World Championships in 2001, 2005, 2007, 2008, and 2009. She failed to qualify for the 2010 Winter Olympics. Fowler is coached by Walter Pichler. Fowler was selected for the London 2012 torch relay in Taunton; she was handed the torch by will.i.am.

Aside from her biathlon career, Fowler has served in the 1 Regiment RLC of the Royal Logistic Corps.
