= Zsófia Gottschall =

Hungarian biathlete and cross-country skier (born 1978)

Personal information
- Nationality: Hungarian
- Born: 7 April 1978 (age 46)

Sport
- Sport: Biathlon

Zsófia Gottschall (born 7 April 1978) is a Hungarian biathlete. She competed in two events at the 2006 Winter Olympics. She also competed in the cross-country skiing at the 2002 Winter Olympics.
