= Li Yang (ski jumper) =

Chinese ski jumper

Li Yang (Chinese: 李洋; pinyin: Lǐ Yáng; born 31 March 1980 in Tonghua, Jilin) is a Chinese ski jumper who has been competing since 2004. At the 2006 Winter Olympics, he finished 16th in the team large hill and 44th in the individual normal hill events.

Li's only World Cup finish was 37th in a large hill event in Japan in 2006. His best career finish was third in a Continental Cup normal hill event in Germany in 2006.
