= Alessio Bolognani =

Italian ski jumper

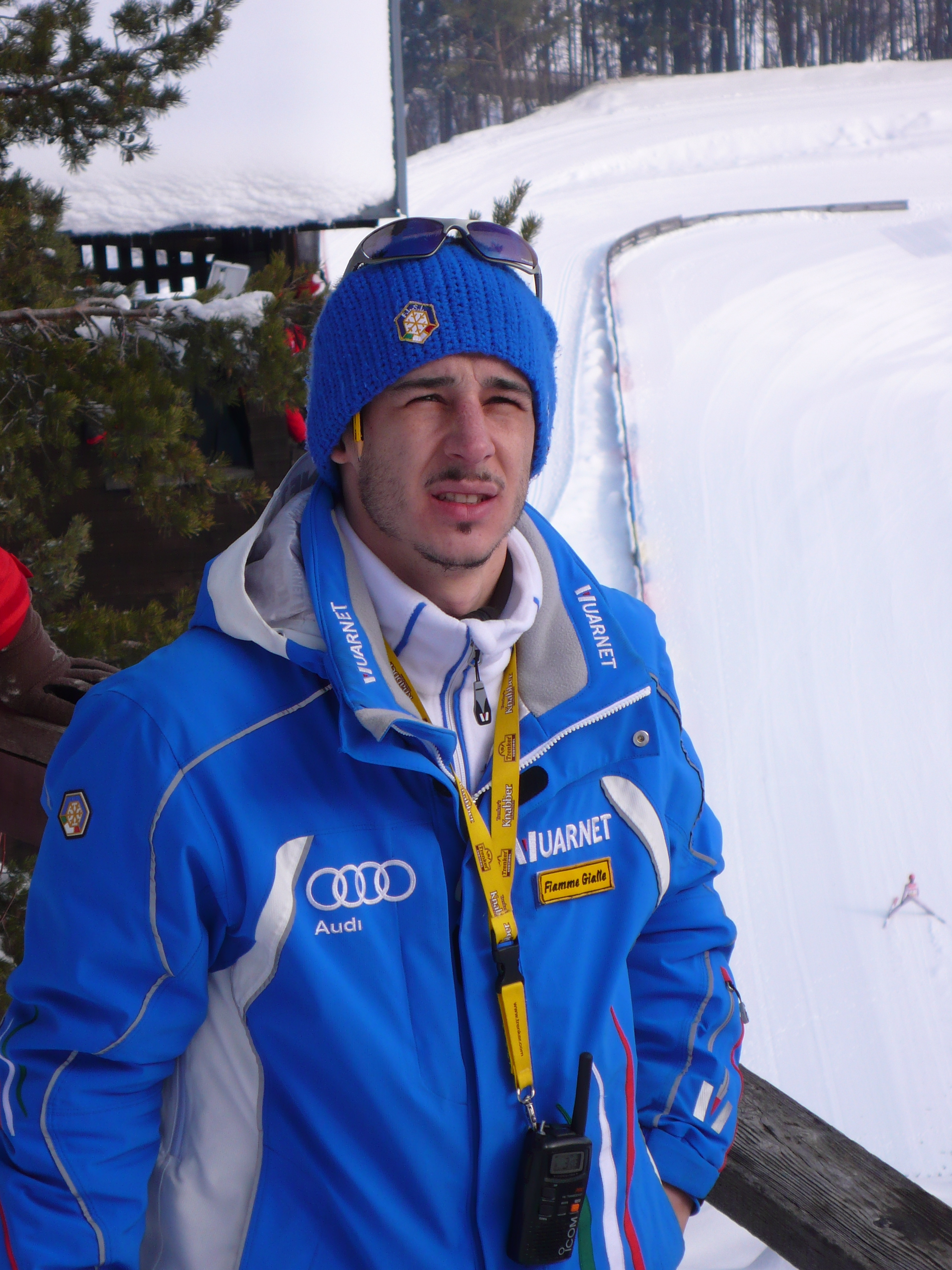
Alessio Bolognani, 2010

Alessio Bolognani (born Cavalese, November 17, 1983) is an Italian ski jumper who has competed since 2002. At the 2006 Winter Olympics in Turin, he finished 11th in the team large hill and 44th in the individual large hill events.

Bolognani's best individual World Cup finish was 42nd in a normal hill event in Germany in 2007. His best individual career finish was 17th in a Continental Cup normal hill event in Slovenia in 2003.

Further notable results

- 2003: 1st, Italian championships of ski jumping
- 2004: 3rd, Italian championships of ski jumping
- 2006:
  - 3rd, Italian championships of ski jumping
  - 3rd, Italian championships of ski jumping, large hill
- 2007:
  - 3rd, Italian championships of ski jumping
  - 3rd, Italian championships of ski jumping, large hill
