= Linda Savļaka =

Latvian biathlete (born 1984)

Personal information
- Nationality: Latvian
- Born: 1 January 1984 (age 41); Gulbene, Latvian SSR

Sport
- Sport: Biathlon

Linda Savļaka (born 1 January 1984) is a Latvian biathlete. She competed in three events at the 2006 Winter Olympics.
