= Thomas Schwall =

American ski jumper

Thomas Schwall (also Tommy Schwall) is an American ski jumper from Steamboat Springs. His best result in the World Cup is a 17th place. He has won 1 event in the Continental Cup, and has been second and fourth as well. Tommy has been 2nd in the US National Championships and 3rd 4 times. He competed on the American team in the 2006 Winter Olympics in Turin and the 2002 Winter Olympics in Salt Lake City, Utah. Schwall has skis from the French company Rossignol.

Tommy has graduated from The University of Colorado with a degree in Business Administration with an emphasis in Marketing and Management.
