= Sandra Keith =

Canadian biathlete

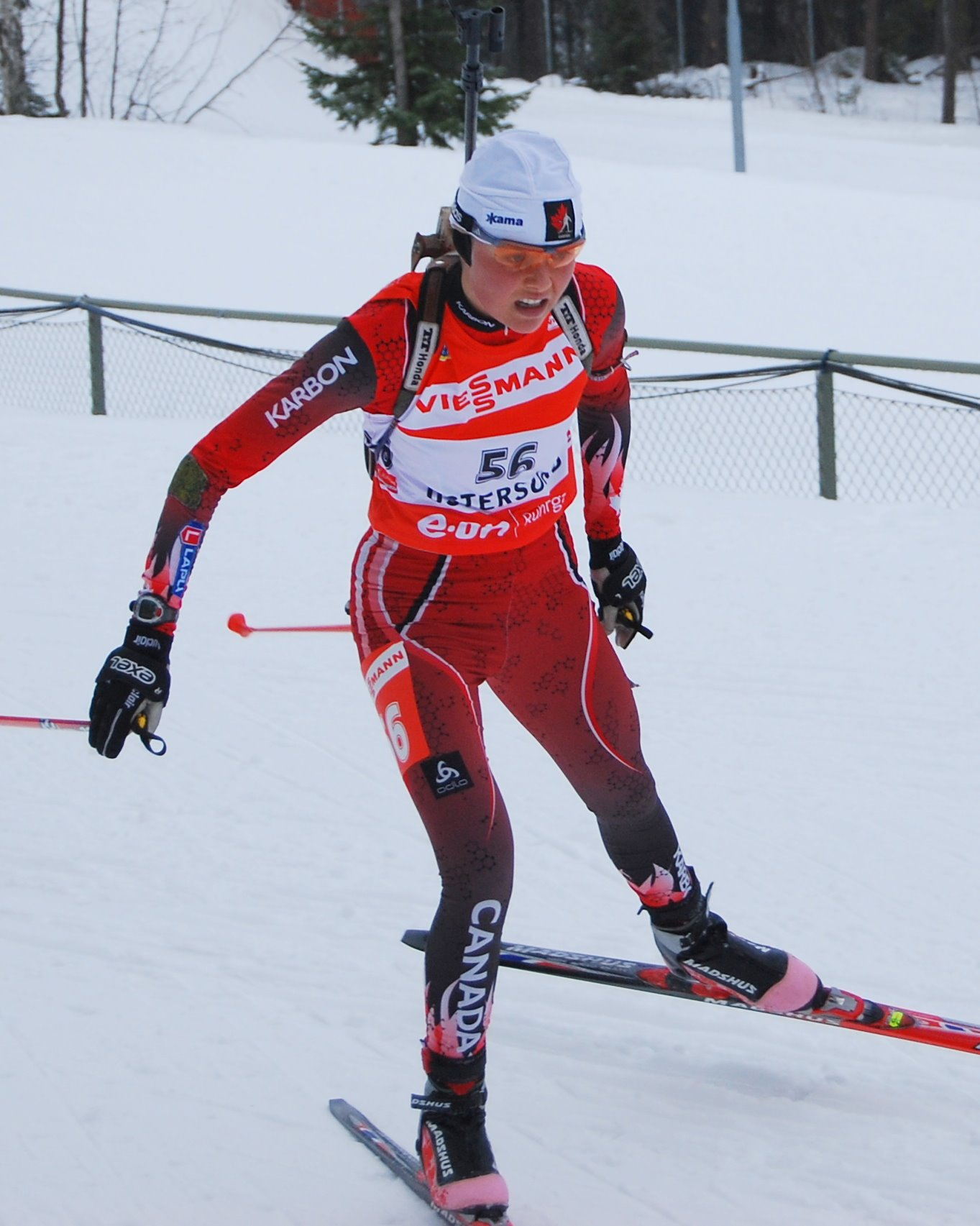
- Sandra Keith during the IBU Biathlon World Championships in Östersund, Sweden in February 2008

Personal information
- Born: 11 December 1980 (age 45) Ottawa, Ontario, Canada

Sport

Sandra Keith (born 11 December 1980) is an Olympic Games biathlete for Team Canada. She was part of Canada's team in the 2006 Winter Olympics in Turin.

Keith retired after the 2009–10 season.

== Personal life ==
Sandra Keith was one of about 20 alumni of the National Sport School (located in Calgary ) to compete in the 2006 games. She is a student at Athabasca University, working on her Bachelor of Commerce degree. She was married to Norwegian biathlon star Halvard Hanevold from 2011 until his death in 2019. She was part of a group of five athletes who posed for the Bold Beautiful Biathlon calendar.
