= Kanae Meguro =

Japanese biathlete (born 1978)

Personal information
- Nationality: Japanese
- Born: 9 September 1978 (age 46)

Sport
- Sport: Biathlon

Kanae Meguro (born 9 September 1978) is a Japanese biathlete. She competed in three events at the 2006 Winter Olympics.
