= Dana Plotogea =

Romanian biathlete (born 1981)

Personal information
- Nationality: Romanian
- Born: 30 September 1981 (age 44)

Sport
- Sport: Biathlon
Medal record
Women's biathlon
Representing Romania
Junior World Championships
Silver medal – second place	2001 Khanty-Mansiysk	12.5 km individual

Dana Plotogea (born 30 September 1981) is a Romanian biathlete. She represented Romania at the 2002 Winter Olympics, the 2006 Winter Olympics, and the 2010 Winter Olympics in Vancouver.
