= Guido Landert =

Swiss ski jumper

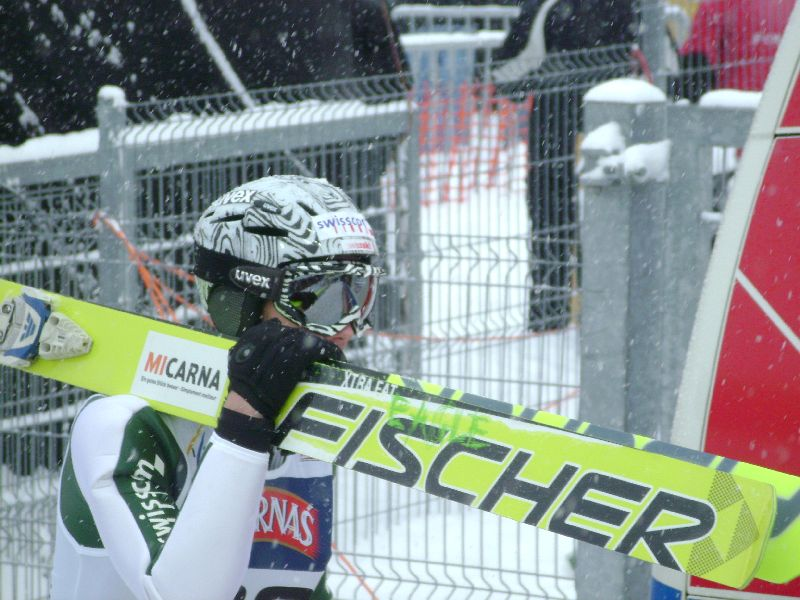
Guido Landert

Guido "Totti" Landert (born November 3, 1985, in Wattwil) is a Swiss ski jumper who competed from 2005 to 2008. At the 2006 Winter Olympics in Turin, he finished seventh in the team large hill, 37th in the individual large hill, and 48th in the individual normal hill events.

Landert competed at the 2007 FIS Nordic World Ski Championships in Sapporo, finishing seventh in the team large hill, 40th in the individual large hill, and 49th in the individual normal hills events. His best finishes at the Ski flying World Championships was sixth in the team event in 2006 and 23rd in the individual event in 2008.

He retired following the 2007-08 World Cup season.
