= Gregory Baxter =

Canadian ski jumper

Gregory Baxter (born September 4, 1989 in Calgary, Alberta) is a Canadian former ski jumper who competed from 1996 to 2008. At the 2006 Winter Olympics in Turin, he finished 15th in the team large hill event.

Baxter finished 12th in the team large hill event at the 2007 FIS Nordic World Ski Championships in Sapporo. His best individual finish so far is 3rd in a Continental Cup normal hill in 2003, Calgary, Alberta.
