= Katarzyna Ponikwia =

Polish biathlete (born 1982)

Personal information
- Nationality: Polish
- Born: 29 October 1982 (age 42); Zakopane, Poland

Sport
- Sport: Biathlon

Katarzyna Ponikwia (born 29 October 1982) is a Polish biathlete. She competed in three events at the 2006 Winter Olympics.
