= Graeme Gorham =

Canadian ski jumper

Graeme Gorham (born June 12, 1987) is a Canadian ski jumper who has been competing since 2003. At the 2006 Winter Olympics in Turin, he finished 15th in the team large hill and 50th in the individual large hill events.

Gorham finished 12th in the team large hill event at the 2007 FIS Nordic World Ski Championships in Sapporo. His best individual finish was 11th in a Continental Cup normal hill in the United States in 2004.

Gorham was born in Edmonton.
