= Katarína Garajová =

Slovak cross-country skier (born 1987)

Personal information
- Nationality: Slovakia
- Born: 21 July 1987 (age 38) Planá, Czechoslovakia

Sport
- Sport: Skiing

World Cup career
- Seasons: 11 – (2006–2011)
- Indiv. starts: 16
- Indiv. podiums: 0
- Team starts: 3
- Team podiums: 0
- Overall titles: 0
- Discipline titles: 0
Medal record
Women's cross-country skiing
Representing Slovakia
European Youth Olympic Winter Festival
Gold medal – first place	2005 Monthey	Mixed 4 × 5 km relay

Katarína Garajová (born 21 July 1987) is a Slovak cross-country skier. She competed in the women's sprint at the 2006 Winter Olympics.

== Cross-country skiing results ==
All results are sourced from the International Ski Federation (FIS).

=== Olympic Games ===
Year	Age	10 km individual	15 km skiathlon	30 km mass start	Sprint	4 × 5 km relay	Team sprint
2006	18	—	—	—	53	—	—

=== World Championships ===
Year	Age	10 km individual	15 km skiathlon	30 km mass start	Sprint	4 × 5 km relay	Team sprint
2007	19	46	—	—	36	—	7
2009	21	—	—	—	56	—	—
2011	23	—	—	—	66	—	—

=== World Cup ===
==== Season standings ====
Season	Age	Discipline standings			Ski Tour standings		
Season	Age	Overall	Distance	Sprint	Nordic Opening	Tour de Ski	World Cup Final
2006	18	NC	—	NC	—N/a	—N/a	—N/a
2007	19	NC	—	NC	—N/a	—	—N/a
2008	20	NC	NC	NC	—N/a	—	—
2009	21	NC	NC	—	—N/a	—	—
2010	22	NC	NC	NC	—N/a	—	—
2011	23	NC	NC	NC	DNF	—	—
