= Estonia at the 2006 Winter Olympics =

- IOC code: EST
- NOC: Estonian Olympic Committee
- Website: www.eok.ee (in Estonian)

in Turin
- Competitors: 26 (17 men, 9 women) in 6 sports
- Flag bearers: Eveli Saue (opening); Kristina Šmigun (closing)
- Medals Ranked 12th: Gold 3 Silver 0 Bronze 0 Total 3

Winter Olympics appearances (overview)
- 1928; 1932; 1936; 1948–1988; 1992; 1994; 1998; 2002; 2006; 2010; 2014; 2018; 2022; 2026

Other related appearances
- Soviet Union (1956–1988)

Estonia sent 27 athletes to the 2006 Winter Olympics in Turin, Italy. Half of them competed in cross-country skiing, where Estonia won all of their three Turin Olympic medals. Olympic champion Andrus Veerpalu participated on his 5th Winter Olympics.

== Medalists ==
Medal	Name	Sport	Event
Gold	Andrus Veerpalu	Cross-country skiing	Men's 15 km classical
Gold	Kristina Šmigun	Cross-country skiing	Women's 15 km pursuit
Gold	Kristina Šmigun	Cross-country skiing	Women's 10 km classical

== Competitors ==
The following is a list of the number of competitors participating at the Games per sport/discipline.

Sport	Men	Women	Total
Alpine skiing	1	1	2
Biathlon	5	1	6
Cross-country skiing	8*	5	13*
Figure skating	1	2	3
Nordic combined	1	—N/a	1
Ski jumping	2	0	2
Total	18*	9	27*

*Including a reserve Raul Olle, who did not compete

== Alpine skiing ==
Athlete	Event	Final				
Athlete	Event	Run 1	Run 2	Run 3	Total	Rank
Tiiu Nurmberg	Women's giant slalom	1:08.39	1:16.70		2:58.09	34
Tiiu Nurmberg	Women's slalom	48.77	54.21		1:42.98	44
Deyvid Oprja	Men's giant slalom	1:40.49	DNF		Did not finish	
Deyvid Oprja	Men's slalom	DNS			Did not start	

Note: In the men's combined, run 1 is the downhill, and runs 2 and 3 are the slalom. In the women's combined, run 1 and 2 are the slalom, and run 3 the downhill.

== Biathlon ==
Athlete	Event	Final		
Athlete	Event	Time	Misses	Rank
Dimitri Borovik	Men's sprint	30:31.6	4	73
Dimitri Borovik	Men's individual	1:03:25.8	5	70
Roland Lessing	Men's sprint	29:30.7	2	58
Roland Lessing	Men's pursuit	41:53.47	6	51
Roland Lessing	Men's individual	1:02:31.2	5	62
Janno Prants	Men's sprint	30:41.0	2	75
Eveli Saue	Women's sprint	24:55.4	1	47
Eveli Saue	Women's pursuit	Lapped		
Eveli Saue	Women's individual	1:00:53.6	5	73
Indrek Tobreluts	Men's sprint	28:47.5	1	40
Indrek Tobreluts	Men's pursuit	40:25.80	4	43
Indrek Tobreluts	Men's individual	1:02:43.6	5	66
Priit Viks	Men's individual	1:04:08.1	5	75
Dimitri Borovik; Indrek Tobreluts; Roland Lessing; Priit Viks	Men's relay	1:27:48.9	2+16	15

== Cross-country skiing ==
Distance

Men

Athlete	Event	Final	
Athlete	Event	Total	Rank
Kaspar Kokk	15 km classical	40:51.7	35
Kaspar Kokk	30 km pursuit	1:17:50.8	19
Jaak Mae	15 km classical	38:35.2	5
Priit Narusk	15 km classical	41:35.8	45
Aivar Rehemaa	30 km pursuit	1:19:51.4	32
Aivar Rehemaa	50 km classical	2:08:00.8	35
Andrus Veerpalu	15 km classical	38:01.3	Gold medal
Aivar Rehemaa; Andrus Veerpalu; Jaak Mae; Kaspar Kokk	4 × 10 km relay	1:45:23.8	8

Women

Athlete	Event	Final	
Athlete	Event	Total	Rank
Tatjana Mannima	10 km classical	31:46.8	51
Tatjana Mannima	30 km freestyle	1:30:42.1	41
Kaili Sirge	10 km classical	32:06.6	56
Kaili Sirge	30 km freestyle	Did not finish	
Kristina Šmigun	10 km classical	27:51.4	Gold medal
Kristina Šmigun	15 km pursuit	42:48.7	Gold medal
Kristina Šmigun	30 km freestyle	1:23:22.5	8
Silja Suija	10 km classical	31:40.9	49
Piret Pormeister; Silja Suija; Kaili Sirge; Tatjana Mannima	4 × 5 km	1:00:24.4	17

Sprint

Athlete	Event	Qualifying		Quarterfinal		Semifinal		Final	
Athlete	Event	Total	Rank	Total	Rank	Total	Rank	Total	Rank
Peeter Kümmel	Men's sprint	2:21.60	38	Did not advance					38
Tatjana Mannima	Women's sprint	2:20.44	41	Did not advance					41
Priit Narusk	Men's sprint	2:22.19	41	Did not advance					41
Piret Pormeister	Women's sprint	2:24.67	54	Did not advance					54
Aivar Rehemaa	Men's sprint	2:26.09	54	Did not advance					54
Anti Saarepuu	Men's sprint	2:17.75	14 Q	2:20.7	2 Q	2:34.8	4	Final B 2:27.9	8
Kaili Sirge	Women's sprint	2:22.42	47	Did not advance					47
Priit Narusk; Anti Saarepuu	Men's team sprint	n/a				18:07.4	7	Did not advance	14
Piret Pormeister; Kaili Sirge	Women's team sprint	n/a				19:13.6	8	Did not advance	15

- Raul Olle was a reserve for the men's relay team, but did not race in any events at the Games.

== Figure skating ==
Athlete	Event	CD		SP/OD		FS/FD		Total	
Athlete	Event	Points	Rank	Points	Rank	Points	Rank	Points	Rank
Jelena Glebova	Ladies'	n/a		38.47	28	Did not advance			28
Diana Rennik; Aleksei Saks	Pairs	n/a		39.72	18	78.41	15	118.13	17

Key: CD = Compulsory dance, FD = Free dance, FS = Free skate, OD = Original dance, SP = Short program

== Nordic combined ==
Athlete	Event	Ski Jumping		Cross-Country		
Athlete	Event	Points	Rank	Deficit	Time	Rank
Tambet Pikkor	Sprint	95.9	38	1:59	20:14.1 +1:45.1	32
Tambet Pikkor	Individual Gundersen	1:88.5	42	4:56	44:39.9 +4:55.3	33

Note: 'Deficit' refers to the amount of time behind the leader a competitor began the cross-country portion of the event. Italicized numbers show the final deficit from the winner's finishing time.

== Ski jumping ==
Athlete	Event	Qualifying		First round		Final		
Athlete	Event	Points	Rank	Points	Rank	Points	Total	Rank
Jaan Jüris	Normal hill	107.0	32 Q	88.5	50	Did not advance		50
Jaan Jüris	Large hill	52.5	48	Did not advance				
Jens Salumäe	Normal hill	117.5	15 Q	112.0	32	Did not advance		32
Jens Salumäe	Large hill	80.3	28 Q	99.4	24 Q	104.4	203.8	23

== The Estonian Delegation ==
The Estonian Olympic Committee sent 28 athletes and 30 representatives to those games.

Representatives

NOC representatives were president Mart Siimann and secretary Toomas Tõnise. Estonian team representatives were delegation head: Martti Raju, press attaché Sven Sommer, Kristjan Oja in biathlon, Tiit Pekk in cross-country skiing and Gunnar Kuura in figure skating.

Team coaches

Kenneth Ellis – alpine skiing, Raini Pohlak and Hillar Zahkna – biathlon, Mati Alaver and Anatoli Šmigun – cross country skiing, Anna Levandi and Ardo Rennik – figure skating, Toomas Nurmsalu – Nordic combined, Hillar Hein – ski jumping.

Biathlon team: Egert Ispert and Tiit Orlovski biathlon service team, Margo Ool – biathlon massage therapist.

Cross-country skiing team: medical doctors and therapists (Tarvo Kiudma, Mihkel Mardna, Lauri Rannama, Meelis Albert) and service team (Margo Pulles, Peep Koidu, Kristjan-Thor Vähi, Are Mets, Magne Myrmo, Eero Bergman, Michael Hasler, Urmas Välbe, Oleg Ragilo, Raul Seema, Assar Jõepera).

VIP guests

- Arnold Rüütel – the President of the Republic of Estonia,
- Andrus Ansip – the Prime Minister of Estonia,
- Raivo Palmaru – the Minister of Culture,
- Urmas Paet – the Foreign Minister.

Judges

Kalju Valgus in biathlon.

Press

Gunnar Press, Jaan Martinson, Tarmo Paju, Mati Hiis (SL Õhtuleht), Andrus Nilk, Risto Berendsen, Tiit Lääne, Marko Mumm (Eesti Päevaleht), Veiko Visnapuu, Deivil Tserp, Priit Pullerits, Raigo Pajula (Postimees), Raul Ranne (Eesti Ekspress), Enn Hallik (Pärnu Postimees), Sulev Oll (Maaleht), Marko Kaljuveer, Lembitu Kuuse, Ivar Jurtšenko, Helar Osila, Anu Säärits, Tauno Peit, Teet Konksi, Valeri Tiivas (Eesti Televisioon), Tiit Karuks, Tarmo Tiisler, Erik Lillo, Hanno Tomber (Eesti Raadio), Margus Uba (European Broadcasting Union).

Estonian team at the opening ceremony

Flag bearer: Eveli Saue (biathlon)

- Athletes: Eveli Saue – biathlon and Tiiu Nurmberg – alpine skiing
- Representatives: Hillar Zahkna, Raini Pohlak, Egert Ispert, Margo Ool, Gunnar Kuura, Ardo Rennik, Kenneth Ellis, Mart Siimann, Toomas Tõnise and Sven Sommer.

== Estonian 2006 Olympic Books ==
- Indrek Schwede – XX taliolümpiamängud. Torino 2006. Tallinn, Inreko Press, 2006.(ISBN 9985-9666-0-0) (in Estonian)
- Gunnar Press – Torino 2006. XX taliolümpiamängud. Tallinn, Ajakirjade Kirjastus, EOK, Postimees, SL Õhtuleht, 2006 (in Estonian)
