= Belarus at the 2006 Winter Olympics =

- IOC code: BLR
- NOC: Belarus Olympic Committee
- Website: www.noc.by (in Russian and English)

in Turin
- Competitors: 28 (14 men, 14 women) in 7 sports
- Flag bearers: Alexandr Popov (opening); Alexander Lasutkin (closing)
- Medals Ranked 21st: Gold 0 Silver 1 Bronze 0 Total 1

Winter Olympics appearances (overview)
- 1994; 1998; 2002; 2006; 2010; 2014; 2018; 2022; 2026

Other related appearances
- Poland (1924–1936); Soviet Union (1952–1988); Unified Team (1992); Individual Neutral Athletes (2026)

Belarus competed at the 2006 Winter Olympics in Turin, Italy. The team collected one medal, a silver in Freestyle Skiing.

== Medalists ==
Medal	Name	Sport	Event
Silver	Dmitri Dashinski	Freestyle skiing	Men's aerials

== Biathlon ==
Men

Athlete	Event	Final		
Athlete	Event	Time	Misses	Rank
Vladimir Drachev	Sprint	30.6992456	9	59
Vladimir Drachev	Individual	59:59.5	4	43
Sergei Novikov	Sprint	28:18.5	1	30
Sergei Novikov	Pursuit	38:49.61	4	30
Sergei Novikov	Individual	58:02.6	3	24
Oleg Ryzhenkov	Sprint	28:15.9	1	29
Oleg Ryzhenkov	Pursuit	38:37.83	5	27
Alexandre Syman	Individual	1:03:31.4	7	71
Rustam Valiullin	Sprint	28:08.4	2	24
Rustam Valiullin	Pursuit	38:32.74	5	26
Rustam Valiullin	Individual	1:00:04.1	5	46
Alexandre Syman; Sergei Novikov; Rustam Valiullin; Oleg Ryzhenkov	Relay	1:25:04.1	1+15	11

Women

Athlete	Event	Final		
Athlete	Event	Time	Misses	Rank
Ludmilla Ananko	Sprint	24:36.1	1	42
Ludmilla Ananko	Pursuit	did not finish		
Ekaterina Ivanova	Sprint	24:30.8	4	37
Ekaterina Ivanova	Pursuit	42:15.50	11	29
Ekaterina Ivanova	Individual	56:09.7	6	44
Olga Nazarova	Sprint	22:53.2	0	8
Olga Nazarova	Pursuit	39:09.70	3	7
Olga Nazarova	Mass start	41:50.5	1	6
Olga Nazarova	Individual	51:59.6	2	7
Ksenia Zikounkova	Individual	1:02:17.5	8	76
Olena Zubrilova	Sprint	22:40.5	0	5
Olena Zubrilova	Pursuit	41:42.91	8	25
Olena Zubrilova	Mass start	43:12.3	4	16
Olena Zubrilova	Individual	52:55.6	1	14
Ekaterina Ivanova; Olga Nazarova; Ludmilla Ananko; Olena Zubrilova	Relay	1:19:19.6	0+8	4

== Cross-country skiing ==
Alexander Lasutkin and Sergei Dolidovich were both scheduled to compete in the Men's 30 km pursuit. However, before the Olympics a blood test showed too much hemoglobin in their blood, and they were suspended from competing for five days. They also did not compete in the Men's team sprint competition.

Distance

Athlete	Event	Final	
Athlete	Event	Total	Rank
Sergei Dolidovich	Men's 50 km freestyle	2:06:22.4	12
Ludmila Korolik Shablouskaya	Women's 10 km classical	30:23.6	30
Ludmila Korolik Shablouskaya	Women's 15 km pursuit	47:07.2	44
Ludmila Korolik Shablouskaya	Women's 30 km freestyle	1:27:44.4	26
Alexander Lasutkin	Men's 15 km classical	39:35.3	15
Alexander Lasutkin	Men's 50 km freestyle	2:08:40.4	40
Viktoria Lopatina	Women's 30 km freestyle	1:31:47.3	44
Ekaterina Rudakova Bulauka	Women's 15 km pursuit	48:09.2	49
Alena Sannikova	Women's 10 km classical	30:15.1	29
Alena Sannikova	Women's 15 km pursuit	47:05.6	43
Alena Sannikova	Women's 30 km freestyle	1:29:30.4	35
Olga Vasiljonok	Women's 15 km pursuit	48:20.4	51
Olga Vasiljonok	Women's 30 km freestyle	1:29:22.8	34
Alena Sannikova; Ludmila Korolik Shablouskaya; Ekaterina Rudakova Bulauka; Olga Vasiljonok	Women's 4 x 5 km relay	58:19.5	15

Sprint

Athlete	Event	Qualifying		Quarterfinal		Semifinal		Final	
Athlete	Event	Total	Rank	Total	Rank	Total	Rank	Total	Rank
Alexander Lasutkin	Men's sprint	2:25.79	52	Did not advance					52
Viktoria Lopatina	Women's sprint	2:16.36	16 Q	2:24.8	5	Did not advance			21
Olga Vasiljonok	Women's sprint	2:18.12	29 Q	2:16.6	5	Did not advance			25
Ekaterina Rudakova Bulauka	Women's sprint	2:23.19	51	Did not advance					21
Sergei Dolidovich; Alexander Lasutkin	Men's team sprint	Did not start							

== Figure skating ==
Athlete	Event	CD		SP/OD		FS/FD		Total	
Athlete	Event	Points	Rank	Points	Rank	Points	Rank	Points	Rank
Sergei Davydov	Men's	n/a		64.65	14 Q	119.94	16	184.59	15

Key: CD = Compulsory Dance, FD = Free Dance, FS = Free Skate, OD = Original Dance, SP = Short Program

== Freestyle skiing ==
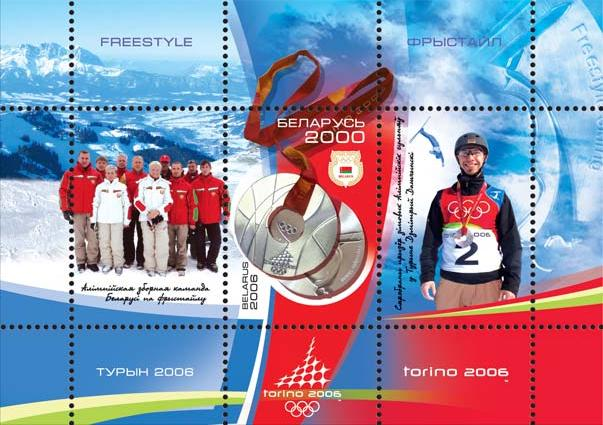
A 2006 Belarusian souvenir sheet featuring the Olympic freestyle skiing team, the silver medal won by Dmitri Dashinski, and Dashinski

Athlete	Event	Qualifying		Final	
Athlete	Event	Points	Rank	Points	Rank
Dmitri Dashinski	Men's aerials	249.34	2 Q	248.68	Silver medal
Alexei Grishin	Men's aerials	242.87	4 Q	245.18	4
Anton Kushnir	Men's aerials	226.33	10 Q	227.66	8
Dmitri Rak	Men's aerials	172.47	24	did not advance	
Assol Slivets	Women's aerials	163.20	11 Q	177.75	5
Alla Tsuper	Women's aerials	168.99	8 Q	137.84	10

== Short track speed skating ==
Athlete	Event	Heat		Quarterfinal		Semifinal		Final	
Athlete	Event	Time	Rank	Time	Rank	Time	Rank	Time	Rank
Julia Elsakova	Women's 500 m	47.726	3	did not advance					20
Julia Elsakova	Women's 1000 m	1:36.885	3	did not advance					17
Julia Elsakova	Women's 1500 m	2:33.564	22	did not advance					22

Key: 'ADV' indicates a skater was advanced due to being interfered with.

== Ski jumping ==
Athlete	Event	Qualifying		First Round		Final		
Athlete	Event	Points	Rank	Points	Rank	Points	Total	Rank
Maksim Anisimov	Normal hill	108.0	28 Q	110.5	33	did not advance		33
Maksim Anisimov	Large hill	68.6	36	did not advance				
Petr Chaadaev	Normal hill	95.5	45	did not advance				
Petr Chaadaev	Large hill	disqualified						

Note: PQ indicates a skier was pre-qualified for the final, based on entry rankings.

== Speed skating ==
Athlete	Event	Race 1		Final	
Athlete	Event	Time	Rank	Time	Rank
Svetlana Radkevich	Women's 500 m	40.45	39.91	1:20.36	27
Svetlana Radkevich	Women's 1000 m	n/a		1:20.11	33
