= Cross-country skiing at the 2006 Winter Olympics – Women's 10 kilometre classical =

Women's 10 kilometre classical at the XX Olympic Winter Games
- Venue: Pragelato
- Dates: 16 February 2006
- Competitors: 72 from 29 nations
- Winning time: 27:51.4

Medalists
1st place, gold medalist(s)		Kristina Šmigun; Estonia
2nd place, silver medalist(s)		Marit Bjørgen; Norway
3rd place, bronze medalist(s)		Hilde Gjermundshaug Pedersen; Norway

The Women's 10 kilometre classical cross-country skiing competition at the 2006 Winter Olympics in Turin, Italy was held on 16 February, at Pragelato.

The world champion at the 10 kilometre event was Kateřina Neumannová – however, that was in the freestyle event, and a classical-style 10 kilometre in the World Championship had not been held since 1989. In the World Cup, however, there had been two events leading up to the Olympics, both won by Norwegians: Marit Bjørgen won at Kuusamo, Finland in November, and Hilde Gjermundshaug Pedersen at Otepää, Estonia in January. Bente Skari won the Olympic gold in 2002, but did not defend her status, having retired after the 2003 World Championship.

Kristina Šmigun won her second gold of the Olympics, winning 21 seconds ahead of Marit Bjørgen, with two other Norwegians following.

In 2014, the Estonian Olympic Committee was notified by the IOC that one of Šmigun's samples from the 2006 Turin Games had been retested with a positive result. On 24 October 2016, the World Anti-Doping Agency Athletes' Commission stated that Šmigun's case will be heard in the Court of Arbitration for Sport by the end of the month. Marit Bjørgen of Norway, winner of the silver medal, would receive the gold medal if Šmigun is stripped of the gold.

== Results ==
Seventy-two skiers entered the race, with all but two completing the course and receiving a rank. Beckie Scott, the 2002 Olympic champion in the pursuit event, was disqualified for skiing outside the marked track, the only such disqualification in the cross-country events in Turin.

Rank	Name	Country	Time
Gold medal	Kristina Šmigun	Estonia	27:51.4
Silver medal	Marit Bjørgen	Norway	28:12.7
Bronze medal	Hilde Gjermundshaug Pedersen	Norway	28:14.0
4	Kristin Størmer Steira	Norway	28:21.0
5	Kateřina Neumannová	Czech Republic	28:22.2
6	Petra Majdič	Slovenia	28:22.3
7	Aino-Kaisa Saarinen	Finland	28:29.6
8	Sara Renner	Canada	28:33.0
9	Virpi Kuitunen	Finland	28:51.4
10	Viola Bauer	Germany	29:03.6
11	Britta Norgren	Sweden	29:07.1
12	Kristin Mürer Stemland	Norway	29:20.5
13	Gabriella Paruzzi	Italy	29:24.0
14	Svetlana Malahova-Shishkina	Kazakhstan	29:24.1
15	Seraina Mischol	Switzerland	29:30.4
16	Natalya Baranova-Masalkina	Russia	29:30.9
17	Claudia Künzel	Germany	29:31.6
18	Wang Chunli	China	29:34.6
19	Larisa Kurkina	Russia	29:36.8
20	Evi Sachenbacher-Stehle	Germany	29:38.4
21	Valentina Shevchenko	Ukraine	29:40.4
22	Élodie Bourgeois-Pin	France	29:40.6
23	Elin Ek	Sweden	29:40.9
24	Olga Zavyalova	Russia	29:57.6
25	Laurence Rochat	Switzerland	30:02.2
26	Yuliya Chepalova	Russia	30:04.7
27	Tatjana Zavalij	Ukraine	30:13.2
28	Alena Procházková	Slovakia	30:13.6
29	Alena Sannikova	Belarus	30:15.1
30	Ludmila Korolik Shablouskaya	Belarus	30:23.6
31	Masako Ishida	Japan	30:24.0
32	Kamila Rajdlová	Czech Republic	30:25.2
33	Lina Andersson	Sweden	30:25.5
34	Antonella Confortola	Italy	30:26.9
35	Riitta-Liisa Lassila	Finland	30:28.4
36	Li Hongxue	China	30:33.9
37	Aurelie Perrillat	France	30:35.9
38	Stefanie Böhler	Germany	30:43.2
39	Cristina Paluselli	Italy	30:46.0
40	Yevgeniya Voloshenko	Kazakhstan	30:47.1
41	Seraina Boner	Switzerland	30:58.0
42	Elena Antonova	Kazakhstan	31:04.4
43	Kati Venäläinen	Finland	31:04.9
44	Kateryna Grygorenko	Ukraine	31:16.6
45	Eva Nývltová	Czech Republic	31:25.8
46	Milaine Thériault	Canada	31:30.4
47	Emelie Öhrstig	Sweden	31:31.6
48	Magda Genuin	Italy	31:37.8
49	Silja Suija	Estonia	31:40.9
50	Wendy Kay Wagner	United States	31:41.0
51	Tatjana Mannima	Estonia	31:46.8
52	Kelime Aydın	Turkey	31:47.1
53	Kikkan Randall	United States	31:49.7
54	Amanda Ammar	Canada	31:51.7
55	Huo Li	China	31:58.7
56	Kaili Sirge	Estonia	32:06.6
57	Abby Larson	United States	32:09.0
58	Jiang Chunli	China	32:22.1
59	Lindsey Weier	United States	32:43.3
60	Mónika György	Romania	32:44.0
61	Natalya Issachenko	Kazakhstan	32:52.9
62	Lee Chae-won	South Korea	32:57.8
63	Laura Orgué	Spain	33:18.6
64	Laia Aubert	Spain	33:29.4
65	Maja Benedičič	Slovenia	33:41.3
66	Maja Kezele	Croatia	35:04.2
67	Jaqueline Mourão	Brazil	35:59.7
68	Erdene-Ochiryn Ochirsüren	Mongolia	36:40.1
69	Leila Gyenesei	Hungary	36:43.0
70	Vedrana Vučićević	Bosnia and Herzegovina	42:45.8
	Beckie Scott	Canada	DQ
	Justyna Kowalczyk	Poland	DNF
