= Emelie Öhrstig =

Swedish skier and cyclist

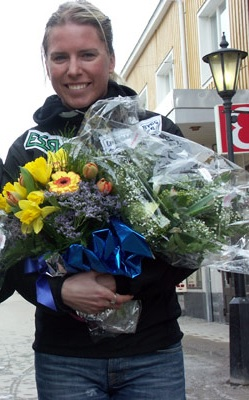
- Emelie Öhrstig

Personal information
- Full name: Frida Emelie Öhrstig
- Nationality: Sweden
- Born: 27 February 1978 (age 48) Borås, Sweden

Sport
- Sport: Skiing
- Club: Piteå Elit

World Cup career
- Seasons: 8 – (1998, 2000–2006)
- Indiv. starts: 46
- Indiv. podiums: 0
- Team starts: 16
- Team podiums: 1
- Team wins: 0
- Overall titles: 0 – (25th in 2005 & 2006)
- Discipline titles: 0
Medal record
Women's cross-country skiing
Representing Sweden
World Championships
Gold medal – first place	2005 Oberstdorf	Individual sprint

Emelie Öhrstig (born 27 February 1978) is a Swedish cross-country skier and road racing cyclist. As a cross-country skier she who won a gold medal during the 2005 Nordic World Ski Championships in Oberstdorf, Germany. She also has eleven additional victories up to 15 km from 2002 to 2005, and her best individual finish in Turin at the 2006 Winter Olympics was 22nd in the individual sprint.

In April 2006 she resigned as a member of the Piteå Elit team and has since been listed on the website for the International Ski Federation as retired.

Along with Per Elofsson, she was an expert commentator for Viasat during 2014 Winter Olympics. Prior to that, she had been an expert commentator at Sveriges Television from 2009, until joining Viasat in 2014. Since August 2014, Öhrstig has been an employee at Volvo Cars. As of 2017, she is currently a director of customer experience and retail for the Swedish market.

== Cross-country skiing results ==
All results are sourced from the International Ski Federation (FIS).

=== Olympic Games ===
Year	Age	10 km individual	15 km skiathlon	30 km mass start	Sprint	4 × 5 km relay	Team sprint
2006	28	47	—	—	22	—	—

=== World Championships ===
- 1 medal – (1 gold)

Year	Age	10 km individual	15 km classical	Pursuit	30 km	Sprint	4 × 5 km relay	Team sprint
2003	25	—	—	—	—	21	—	—N/a
2005	27	—	—N/a	—	—	Gold	—	9

=== World Cup ===
==== Season standings ====
Season	Age					
Season	Age	Overall	Distance	Long Distance	Middle Distance	Sprint
1998	20	NC	—N/a	NC	—N/a	—
2000	22	71	—N/a	NC	—	51
2001	23	89	—N/a	—N/a	—N/a	62
2002	24	88	—N/a	—N/a	—N/a	61
2003	25	36	—N/a	—N/a	—N/a	11
2004	26	31	NC	—N/a	—N/a	11
2005	27	25	NC	—N/a	—N/a	9
2006	28	25	—	—N/a	—N/a	9

==== Team podiums ====
- 1 podium – (1 TS)

No.	Season	Date	Location	Race	Level	Place	Teammate
1	2004–05	23 January 2005	Pragelato, Italy	6 × 1.2 km Team Sprint C	World Cup	2nd	Dahlberg
