= Maja Benedičič =

Slovenian skier

Personal information
- Nationality: Slovenia
- Born: 27 January 1982 (age 44) Kranj, Slovenia

Sport
- Sport: Skiing
- Club: TSK Merkur

World Cup career
- Seasons: 7 – (2003–2008, 2010)
- Indiv. starts: 33
- Indiv. podiums: 0
- Team starts: 3
- Team podiums: 0
- Overall titles: 0
- Discipline titles: 0
Medal record
Women's cross-country skiing
Representing Slovenia
U23 World Championships
Gold medal – first place	2005 Oberstdorf	15 km skiathlon
- Updated on 27 May 2019

Maja Benedičič (born 27 January 1982) is a Slovenian cross-country skier. She competed in four events at the 2006 Winter Olympics.

== Cross-country skiing results ==
All results are sourced from the International Ski Federation (FIS).

=== Olympic Games ===
Year	Age	10 km individual	15 km skiathlon	30 km mass start	Sprint	4 × 5 km relay	Team sprint
2006	24	65	39	DNF	—	—	14

=== World Championships ===
Year	Age	10 km individual	15 km skiathlon	30 km mass start	Sprint	4 × 5 km relay	Team sprint
2005	23	31	31	39	53	—	—
2009	27	—	—	41	—	—	—

=== World Cup ===
==== Season standings ====
Season	Age	Discipline standings			Ski Tour standings	
Season	Age	Overall	Distance	Sprint	Tour de Ski	World Cup Final
2003	21	NC	—N/a	—	—N/a	—N/a
2004	22	NC	NC	—	—N/a	—N/a
2005	23	NC	NC	NC	—N/a	—N/a
2006	24	NC	NC	NC	—N/a	—N/a
2007	25	NC	NC	NC	DNF	—N/a
2008	26	NC	NC	NC	45	—
2010	28	NC	NC	NC	—	—
