= Maryna Lisohor =

Ukrainian cross-country skier (born 1983)

Personal information
- Nationality: Ukraine
- Born: 11 May 1983 (age 43) Chernihiv, Ukrainian SSR, Soviet Union

Sport
- Sport: Skiing

World Cup career
- Seasons: 2 – (2007, 2010)
- Indiv. starts: 5
- Indiv. podiums: 0
- Team starts: 0
- Overall titles: 0
- Discipline titles: 0
Medal record
Women's cross-country skiing
Representing Ukraine
Winter Universiade
Silver medal – second place	2009 Harbin	Relay
Bronze medal – third place	2009 Harbin	Individual sprint

Maryna Oleksandrivna Lisohor (Ukrainian: Марина Олександрівна Лісогор, born 11 May 1983) is a Ukrainian cross-country skier. On 22 February 2014, she tested positive for trimetazidine and was expelled from the 2014 Winter Olympics.

== Cross-country skiing results ==
All results are sourced from the International Ski Federation (FIS).

=== Olympic Games ===
Year	Age	10 km individual	15 km skiathlon	30 km mass start	Sprint	4 × 5 km relay	Team sprint
2006	22	—	—	DNF	43	—	16
2014	30	56	—	—	57	—	DNS

=== World Championships ===
Year	Age	10 km individual	15 km skiathlon	30 km mass start	Sprint	4 × 5 km relay	Team sprint
2005	21	—	—	—	43	DSQ	13

=== World Cup ===
==== Season standings ====
Season	Age	Discipline standings			Ski Tour standings	
Season	Age	Overall	Distance	Sprint	Tour de Ski	World Cup Final
2007	23	NC	—	NC	—	—
2010	26	NC	—	NC	—	—
