= Natalya Issachenko =

Kazakhstani cross-country skier (born 1979)

Natalya Isachenko
Personal information
- Nationality: Kazakhstan
- Born: 14 February 1979 (age 47) Cheremshanka, Kazakh SSR, Soviet Union

Sport
- Sport: Skiing

World Cup career
- Seasons: 2004, 2006–2007
- Indiv. starts: 8
- Indiv. podiums: 0
- Team starts: 6
- Team podiums: 0
- Overall titles: 0 – (70th in 2007)
- Discipline titles: 0

Natalya Isachenko (born 14 February 1979) is a Kazakhstani cross-country skier. She competed at the 2002 Winter Olympics and the 2006 Winter Olympics.

== Cross-country skiing results ==
All results are sourced from the International Ski Federation (FIS).

=== Olympic Games ===
Year	Age	10 km	15 km	Pursuit	30 km	Sprint	4 × 5 km relay	Team sprint
2002	23	—	49	—	—	51	—	—N/a
2006	27	61	—N/a	—	38	45	—	—

=== World Championships ===
Year	Age	10 km	15 km	Pursuit	30 km	Sprint	4 × 5 km relay	Team sprint
2001	22	—	—	55	CNX^{[a]}	29	—	—N/a
2007	28	45	—N/a	—	39	56	—	—

a. ^{1} Cancelled due to extremely cold weather.

=== World Cup ===
==== Season standings ====
Season	Age	Discipline standings			Ski Tour standings
Season	Age	Overall	Distance	Sprint	Tour de Ski
2004	25	NC	—	NC	—N/a
2006	27	70	52	69	—N/a
2007	28	NC	NC	NC	—
