= Élodie Bourgeois-Pin =

French cross-country skier (born 1982)

Personal information
- Nationality: France
- Born: 2 March 1982 (age 44) Champagnole, France

Sport
- Sport: Skiing

World Cup career
- Seasons: 9 – (2003–2011)
- Indiv. starts: 78
- Indiv. podiums: 0
- Team starts: 17
- Team podiums: 0
- Overall titles: 0 – (61st in 2005)
- Discipline titles: 0
Medal record
Women's cross-country skiing
Representing France
Junior World Championships
Gold medal – first place	2002 Schonach	5 km freestyle

Élodie Bourgeois-Pin (born 2 March 1982) is a French cross-country skier. She competed in four events at the 2006 Winter Olympics.

== Cross-country skiing results ==
All results are sourced from the International Ski Federation (FIS).

=== Olympic Games ===
Year	Age	10 km individual	15 km skiathlon	30 km mass start	Sprint	4 × 5 km relay	Team sprint
2006	24	22	—	36	55	—	11

=== World Championships ===
Year	Age	10 km	15 km	Pursuit	30 km	Sprint	4 × 5 km relay	Team sprint
2003	21	—	—	46	—	—	9	—N/a
2005	23	—	—N/a	DNF	—	30	9	—
2007	25	—	—N/a	DNS	—	35	—	17
2009	27	50	—N/a	—	—	—	8	—

=== World Cup ===
==== Season standings ====
Season	Age	Discipline standings			Ski Tour standings		
Season	Age	Overall	Distance	Sprint	Nordic Opening	Tour de Ski	World Cup Final
2003	20	NC	—N/a	NC	—N/a	—N/a	—N/a
2004	21	84	69	NC	—N/a	—N/a	—N/a
2005	22	61	52	48	—N/a	—N/a	—N/a
2006	23	113	81	NC	—N/a	—N/a	—N/a
2007	24	67	65	40	—N/a	37	—N/a
2008	25	79	59	70	—N/a	DNF	—
2009	26	117	89	84	—N/a	—	—
2010	27	NC	NC	NC	—N/a	—	—
2011	28	NC	NC	NC	—	—	—
