= Kazakhstan at the 2006 Winter Olympics =

- IOC code: KAZ
- NOC: National Olympic Committee of the Republic of Kazakhstan
- Website: www.olympic.kz (in Kazakh, Russian, and English)

in Turin
- Competitors: 56 (44 men, 12 women) in 7 sports
- Flag bearers: Aleksandr Koreshkov (opening); Radik Zhaparov (closing)
- Medals: Gold 0 Silver 0 Bronze 0 Total 0

Winter Olympics appearances (overview)
- 1994; 1998; 2002; 2006; 2010; 2014; 2018; 2022; 2026; 2030

Other related appearances
- Soviet Union (1956–1988); Unified Team (1992)

Kazakhstan competed at the 2006 Winter Olympics in Turin, Italy. Their largest contingent was their ice hockey squad of 23, in which Kazakhstan qualified after winning a qualifying series also including Austria, France and Ukraine. The cross country skiing team was also sizeable, with of 19 Kazakh athletes entered.

== Alpine skiing ==
Athlete	Event	Final				
Athlete	Event	Run 1	Run 2	Run 3	Total	Rank
Vera Eremenko	Women's giant slalom	1:10.32	1:19.43		2:29.75	36
Vera Eremenko	Women's slalom	50.73	55.27		1:46.00	47
Victor Ryabchenko	Men's giant slalom	1:29.52	1:31.14		3:00.66	33
Victor Ryabchenko	Men's slalom	DNF			did not finish	

== Biathlon ==
Athlete	Event	Final		
Athlete	Event	Time	Misses	Rank
Alexsandr Chervyhkov	Men's sprint	29:27.1	2	56
Alexsandr Chervyhkov	Men's pursuit	43:28.44	8	53
Alexsandr Chervyhkov	Men's individual	1:03:56.4	6	73
Anna Lebedeva	Women's sprint	25:21.8	2	52
Anna Lebedeva	Women's pursuit	Lapped		
Anna Lebedeva	Women's individual	56:46.5	4	49

== Cross-country skiing ==
Distance

Men

Athlete	Event	Final	
Athlete	Event	Total	Rank
Dmitrij Eremenko	15 km classical	40:42.8	30
Dmitrij Eremenko	30 km pursuit	1:22:09.9	44
Andrey Golovko	15 km classical	40:58.0	37
Andrey Golovko	30 km pursuit	1:19:34.3	29
Andrey Golovko	50 km freestyle	2:07:19.6	29
Andrey Kondroschev	30 km pursuit	1:25:51.4	60
Andrey Kondroschev	50 km freestyle	2:23:24.2	54
Denis Krivushkin	50 km freestyle	2:08:05.3	37
Maxim Odnovortsev	15 km classical	40:53.2	36
Maxim Odnovortsev	30 km pursuit	1:17:09.6	9
Maxim Odnovortsev	50 km freestyle	2:06:23.4	13
Alexey Poltaranin	15 km classical	41:09.7	39
Andrey Golovko; Dmitrij Eremenko; Maxim Odnovortsev; Yevgeniy Koschevoy	4 x 10 km relay	1:49:03.6	13

Women

Athlete	Event	Final	
Athlete	Event	Total	Rank
Elena Antonova	10 km classical	31:04.4	42
Natalya Issachenko	10 km classical	32:52.9	61
Natalya Issachenko	30 km freestyle	1:30:04.3	38
Oxana Jatskaja	15 km pursuit	46:57.0	41
Oxana Jatskaja	30 km freestyle	1:25:30.5	15
Elena Kolomina	15 km pursuit	45:44.1	25
Elena Kolomina	30 km freestyle	1:26:06.4	19
Svetlana Malahova-Shishkina	10 km classical	29:24.1	14
Svetlana Malahova-Shishkina	15 km pursuit	44:00.0	12
Svetlana Malahova-Shishkina	30 km freestyle	1:30:41.5	40
Yevgeniya Voloshenko	10 km classical	30:47.1	40
Yevgeniya Voloshenko	15 km pursuit	48:17.2	50
Oxana Jatskaja; Yevgeniya Voloshenko; Elena Kolomina; Svetlana Malahova-Shishkina	4 x 5 km relay	57:52.9	13

Sprint

Athlete	Event	Qualifying		Quarterfinal		Semifinal		Final	
Athlete	Event	Total	Rank	Total	Rank	Total	Rank	Total	Rank
Nikolay Chebotko	Men's sprint	2:21.23	35	Did not advance					35
Sergey Cherepanov	Men's sprint	2:26.48	55	Did not advance					55
Natalya Issachenko	Women's sprint	2:21.22	45	Did not advance					45
Oxana Jatskaja	Women's sprint	2:22.12	46	Did not advance					46
Elena Kolomina	Women's sprint	2:20.28	38	Did not advance					38
Yevgeniy Koschevoy	Men's sprint	2:18.88	18 Q	2:20.7	3	Did not advance			14
Yevgeni Safonov	Men's sprint	2:22.99	45	Did not advance					45
Daria Starostina	Women's sprint	2:27.58	60	Did not advance					60
Nikolay Chebotko; Yevgeniy Koschevoy	Men's team sprint	n/a				17:42.6	5 Q	17:25.1	6
Oxana Jatskaja; Elena Kolomina	Women's team sprint	n/a				17:36.3	5 Q	17:42.8	9

== Freestyle skiing ==
Athlete	Event	Qualifying		Final	
Athlete	Event	Points	Rank	Points	Rank
Dmitriy Reiherd	Men's moguls	18.33	33	did not advance	33
Yuliya Rodionova	Women's moguls	16.76	28	did not advance	28
Darya Rybalova	Women's moguls	18.70	25	did not advance	25

== Ice hockey ==
=== Men's ===
Summary Key:

- OT – Overtime
- GWS – Match decided by penalty-shootout

Team	Event	Group stage					Qualification playoff	Quarterfinal	Semifinal	Final / BM	
Team	Event	Opposition Score	Opposition Score	Opposition Score	Opposition Score	Opposition Score	Opposition Score	Opposition Score	Opposition Score	Opposition Score	Rank
Kazakhstan men's	Men's tournament	Sweden; L 2–7	United States; L 1–4	Russia; L 0–1	Slovakia; L 1–2	Latvia; W 5–2	—	Did not advance			9

Players

The following is the Kazakh roster for the men's ice hockey tournament at the 2006 Winter Olympics.

Head coach: Nikolai Myshagin

Assistant coach: (Russia) Gennadi Tsygurov

No.	Pos.	Name	Height	Weight	Birthdate	Team
1	G	Kirill Zinovyev	5 ft 11 in (180 cm)	183 lb (83 kg)	February 22, 1979 (aged 26)	(Kazakhstan) Torpedo Ust-Kamenogrosk
2	D	Alexei Vasilchenko	6 ft 1 in (185 cm)	196 lb (89 kg)	March 29, 1981 (aged 24)	(Russia) Neftekhimik Nizhnekamsk
11	D	Vladimir Antipin	6 ft 2 in (188 cm)	203 lb (92 kg)	April 18, 1970 (aged 35)	(Russia) Khimik Mytischi
12	D	Oleg Kovalenko	5 ft 10 in (178 cm)	198 lb (90 kg)	February 11, 1975 (aged 31)	(Kazakhstan) Kazzinc-Torpedo
16	D	Yevgeni Blokhin	6 ft 2 in (188 cm)	207 lb (94 kg)	May 29, 1979 (aged 26)	(Russia) HK MVD-THK Tver
17	F	Alexander Koreshkov (C)	5 ft 11 in (180 cm)	205 lb (93 kg)	October 28, 1968 (aged 37)	(Kazakhstan) Kazzinc-Torpedo
18	F	Konstantin Shafranov	6 ft 0 in (183 cm)	198 lb (90 kg)	September 11, 1968 (aged 37)	(Russia) Krylia Sovetov Moskva
19	F	Yevgeni Koreshkov (A)	5 ft 7 in (170 cm)	181 lb (82 kg)	March 11, 1970 (aged 35)	(Kazakhstan) Kazzinc-Torpedo
20	G	Vitali Kolesnik	6 ft 3 in (191 cm)	209 lb (95 kg)	August 20, 1979 (aged 26)	(United States) Lowell Lock Monsters
21	F	Dmitri Dudarev	6 ft 2 in (188 cm)	209 lb (95 kg)	February 23, 1976 (aged 29)	(Russia) Ak Bars Kazan
22	F	Andrei Ogorondnikov	5 ft 10 in (178 cm)	176 lb (80 kg)	August 29, 1982 (aged 23)	(Kazakhstan) Kazzinc-Torpedo
23	F	Andrei Pchelyakov	5 ft 10 in (178 cm)	176 lb (80 kg)	February 19, 1972 (aged 33)	(Russia) Krylia Sovetov Moskva
25	F	Andrei Samokvalov	6 ft 0 in (183 cm)	192 lb (87 kg)	May 10, 1975 (aged 30)	(Russia) Torpedo Nizhny Novgorod
26	D	Andrei Savenkov^{1}	6 ft 0 in (183 cm)	194 lb (88 kg)	March 7, 1975 (aged 30)	(Kazakhstan) Kazzinc-Torpedo
30	D	Denis Shemelin	6 ft 3 in (191 cm)	205 lb (93 kg)	June 24, 1978 (aged 27)	(Russia) Neftekhimik Nizhnekamsk
30	G	Vitali Yeremeyev	6 ft 0 in (183 cm)	203 lb (92 kg)	September 23, 1975 (aged 30)	(Russia) Dynamo Moskva
34	F	Sergei Alexandrov	5 ft 11 in (180 cm)	185 lb (84 kg)	August 29, 1978 (aged 27)	(Kazakhstan) Kazzinc-Torpedo
36	F	Dmitri Upper	6 ft 1 in (185 cm)	203 lb (92 kg)	July 27, 1978 (aged 27)	(Russia) CSKA Moskva
43	D	Yevgeni Pupkov	6 ft 0 in (183 cm)	205 lb (93 kg)	January 18, 1978 (aged 28)	(Russia) SKA St. Petersburg
52	D	Alexei Koledayev	6 ft 0 in (183 cm)	203 lb (92 kg)	March 27, 1976 (aged 29)	(Russia) Sibir Novosibirsk
55	F	Andrei Troshchinsky	6 ft 5 in (196 cm)	203 lb (92 kg)	February 14, 1978 (aged 28)	(Kazakhstan) Kazzinc-Torpedo
64	D	Artyom Argokov	6 ft 1 in (185 cm)	203 lb (92 kg)	January 16, 1976 (aged 30)	(Russia) Metallurg Novokuznetsk
79	F	Fyodor Polishchuk	5 ft 9 in (175 cm)	176 lb (80 kg)	July 4, 1979 (aged 26)	(Russia) SKA St. Petersburg
80	F	Nikolai Antropov (A)	6 ft 6 in (198 cm)	245 lb (111 kg)	February 18, 1980 (aged 25)	(Canada) Toronto Maple Leafs

- ^{1} Andrei Savenkov replaced Evgeni Blokhin on the team roster after the first two games of the tournament.

Round-robin

Pos	Team	Pld	W	D	L	GF	GA	GD	Pts	Qualification
1	Slovakia	5	5	0	0	18	8	+10	10	Quarterfinals
2	Russia	5	4	0	1	23	11	+12	8	Quarterfinals
3	Sweden	5	3	0	2	15	12	+3	6	Quarterfinals
4	United States	5	1	1	3	13	13	0	3	Quarterfinals
5	Kazakhstan	5	1	0	4	9	16	−7	2	
6	Latvia	5	0	1	4	11	29	−18	1	

Source: IIHF

15 February 2006; 11:35	Kazakhstan	2–7 (0–3, 1–4, 1–0)	Sweden	Torino Esposizioni, Turin; Attendance: 2,200

Game reference

Vitali Yeremeyev
Goalies
Stefan Liv
Referee:
(Czech Republic) Vladimír Šindler
Linesmen:
(Finland) Stefan Fonselius
(Canada) Pierre Racicot

	0–1	7:45 – D. Tjärnqvist (J. Jönsson, T. Holmström)
	0–2	10:46 – D. Alfredsson (PP)
	0–3	16:06 – H. Sedin (M. Samuelsson, D. Sedin)
E. Koreshkov (SH) – 20:17	1–3
	1–4	28:47 – P. Axelsson (S. Påhlsson, M. Öhlund)
	1–5	31:08 – M. Sundin (C. Bäckman, F. Modin) (PP)
	1–6	35:31 – D. Sedin (M. Öhlund, H. Sedin)
	1–7	36:21 – D. Tjärnqvist (P. Axelsson, S. Påhlsson)
V. Antipin (D. Upper) – 48:33	2–7

18 min
Penalties
6 min
14
Shots
34

16 February 2006; 21:05	United States	4–1 (3–0, 0–0, 1–1)	Kazakhstan	Torino Esposizioni, Turin; Attendance: 3,400

Game reference

Rick DiPietro
Goalies
Vitali Kolesnik
Referee:
(Sweden) Thomas Andersson
Linesmen:
(Canada) Derek Doucette
(Finland) Antti Hämäläinen

B. Guerin (C. Drury) – 1:34	1–0
B. Rolston (D. Weight) (PP) – 8:31	2–0
B. Gionta (J. Liles, S. Gomez) (PP) – 16:50	3–0
	3–1	51:02 – E. Koreshkov (A. Vassilchenko) (PP)
M. Modano (E. Cole) – 51:53	4–1

10 min
Penalties
20 min
36
Shots
12

18 February 2006; 11:35	Kazakhstan	0–1 (0–0, 0–1, 0–0)	Russia	Torino Esposizioni, Turin; Attendance: 3,660

Game reference
Vitali Yeremeyev	Goalies	Evgeni Nabokov	Referee: (Sweden) Christer Lärking; Linesmen: (Finland) Stefan Fonselius (Germany) Thomas Gemeinhardt
0–1 / 31:38 – A. Kharitonov (M. Sushinsky, E. Malkin)			Referee: (Sweden) Christer Lärking; Linesmen: (Finland) Stefan Fonselius (Germany) Thomas Gemeinhardt
26 min	Penalties	12 min	Referee: (Sweden) Christer Lärking; Linesmen: (Finland) Stefan Fonselius (Germany) Thomas Gemeinhardt
24	Shots	50	Referee: (Sweden) Christer Lärking; Linesmen: (Finland) Stefan Fonselius (Germany) Thomas Gemeinhardt

19 February 2006; 16:05	Slovakia	2–1 (0–1, 1–0, 1–0)	Kazakhstan	Palasport Olimpico, Turin; Attendance: 9,160

Game reference

Karol Križan
Goalies
Vitali Kolesnik
Referee:
(Switzerland) Danny Kurmann
Linesmen:
(Canada) Derek Doucette
(Finland) Antti Hämäläinen

	0–1	16:16 – E. Koreshkov (A. Koreshkov, A. Savenkov) (PP)
P. Bondra (R. Kapuš, M. Jurčina) (PP) – 39:50	1–1
Mari. Hossa (P. Demitra, M. Gáborík) – 48:09	2–1

12 min
Penalties
20 min
27
Shots
19

21 February 2006; 11:35	Latvia	2–5 (1–1, 0–1, 1–3)	Kazakhstan	Torino Esposizioni, Turin; Attendance: 2,300

Game reference

Sergejs Naumovs
Goalies
Vitali Yeremeyev
Referee:
(Sweden) Christer Lärking
Linesmen:
(Canada) Derek Doucette
(Germany) Thomas Gemeinhardt

	0–1	7:20 – A. Koreshkov (E. Koreshkov)
L. Tambijevs (A. Ņiživijs) (PP) – 15:13	1–1
	1–2	35:04 – N. Antropov (E. Koreshkov)
A. Cipruss (G. Panteļejevs, A. Tribuncovs) – 45:04	2–2
	2–3	52:33 – S. Alexandrov (F. Polishchuk, A. Troschinsky)
	2–4	54:53 – E. Koreshkov (PS)
	2–5	58:08 – E. Koreshkov (A. Koreshkov)

14 min
Penalties
6 min
32
Shots
30

== Ski jumping ==
Athlete	Event	Qualifying		First Round		Final		
Athlete	Event	Points	Rank	Points	Rank	Points	Total	Rank
Ivan Karaulov	Normal hill	109.0	26 Q	102.0	46	did not advance		46
Ivan Karaulov	Large hill	92.1	15 Q	68.9	46	did not advance		46
Nikolay Karpenko	Normal hill	disqualified						
Nikolay Karpenko	Large hill	84.6	25 Q	65.2	48	did not advance		48
Alexey Korolev	Normal hill	86.5	48	did not advance				
Alexey Korolev	Large hill	63.5	41	did not advance				
Radik Zhaparov	Normal hill	110.0	25 Q	115.0	28 Q	112.0	227.0	26
Radik Zhaparov	Large hill	86.7	21 Q	95.7	31	did not advance		31
Ivan Karaulov; Nikolay Karpenko; Alexey Korolev; Radik Zhaparov	Team	n/a		322.2	12	did not advance		12

== Speed skating ==
Athlete	Event	Race 1		Final	
Athlete	Event	Time	Rank	Time	Rank
Dmitry Babenko	Men's 5000 m	n/a		6:42.25	23
Aleksey Belyayev	Men's 1500 m	n/a		1:52.20	39
Nataliya Rybakova	Women's 3000 m	n/a		4:38.76	28
Aleksandr Zhigin	Men's 500 m	36.88	36.92	1:13.80	34
Aleksandr Zhigin	Men's 1000 m	n/a		1:12.36	36
