= Piret Pormeister =

Estonian cross-country skier (born 1985)

Personal information
- Nationality: Estonia
- Born: 16 May 1985 (age 41) Tallinn, Estonia

Sport
- Sport: Skiing

World Cup career
- Seasons: 12 – (2004–2015)
- Indiv. starts: 49
- Indiv. podiums: 0
- Team starts: 11
- Team podiums: 0
- Overall titles: 0 – (90th in 2007)
- Discipline titles: 0
Medal record
Women's cross-country skiing
Representing Estonia
U23 World Championships
Bronze medal – third place	2007 Tarvisio	Individual sprint

Piret Pormeister (born 16 May 1985) is an Estonian cross-country skier. She competed in three events at the 2006 Winter Olympics.

== Cross-country skiing results ==
All results are sourced from the International Ski Federation (FIS).

=== Olympic Games ===
Year	Age	10 km individual	15 km skiathlon	30 km mass start	Sprint	4 × 5 km relay	Team sprint
2006	20	—	—	—	54	17	15

=== World Championships ===
Year	Age	10 km individual	15 km skiathlon	30 km mass start	Sprint	4 × 5 km relay	Team sprint
2007	21	—	—	—	31	15	18
2011	25	—	—	—	56	—	11
2013	27	—	—	—	44	—	15
2015	29	—	—	—	43	—	—

=== World Cup ===
==== Season standings ====
Season	Age	Discipline standings			Ski Tour standings		
Season	Age	Overall	Distance	Sprint	Nordic Opening	Tour de Ski	World Cup Final
2004	18	NC	—	NC	—N/a	—N/a	—N/a
2005	19	NC	NC	—	—N/a	—N/a	—N/a
2006	20	NC	—	NC	—N/a	—N/a	—N/a
2007	21	90	NC	55	—N/a	—	—N/a
2008	22	NC	—	NC	—N/a	—	—
2009	23	NC	—	NC	—N/a	—	—
2010	24	NC	—	NC	—N/a	—	—
2011	25	121	—	84	—	—	—
2012	26	100	NC	71	70	—	—
2013	27	NC	NC	NC	58	—	—
2014	28	NC	NC	NC	DNF	—	—
2015	29	NC	—	NC	—	—	—N/a
