= Tatjana Mannima =

Estonian cross-country skier (born 1980)

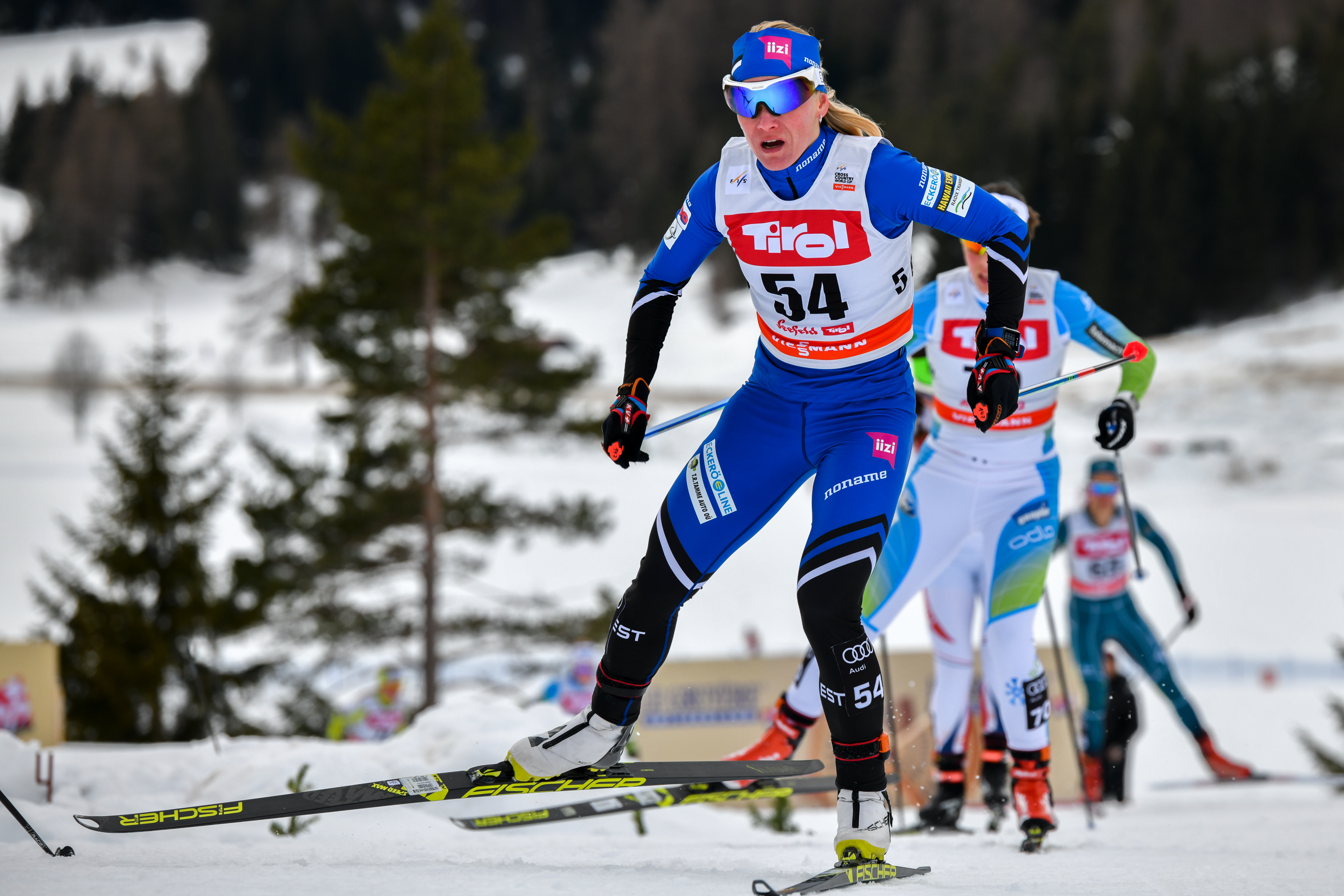
- Mannima in 2018

Personal information
- Nationality: Estonia
- Born: 10 January 1980 (age 46) Kiviõli, Estonia

Sport
- Sport: Skiing
- Club: Kiviõli Suusaklubi

World Cup career
- Seasons: 11 – (2006–2010, 2012–2015, 2017–2018)
- Indiv. starts: 89
- Indiv. podiums: 0
- Team starts: 6
- Team podiums: 0
- Overall titles: 0 – (95th in 2007)
- Discipline titles: 0

Tatjana Mannima (born 10 January 1980) is an Estonian cross-country skier. She represented Estonia in 2006, 2010 and 2018 Winter Olympics, she earned her best finish of 17th in the 4 × 5 km relay at Turin at 2006 while her best individual finish was 41st both in the individual sprint and 30 km events at those same games.

Mannima's best finish at the FIS Nordic World Ski Championships was 15th twice in the 4 × 5 km relay (2007, 2009) while her best individual finish was 41st in the 30 km event at Liberec in 2009.

Her best World Cup finish was tenth in the 4 × 5 km relay at Sweden in 2007 while her best individual finish was 25th in a 15 km mixed pursuit at those same event.

== Cross-country skiing results ==
All results are sourced from the International Ski Federation (FIS).

=== Olympic Games ===
Year	Age	10 km individual	15 km skiathlon	30 km mass start	Sprint	4 × 5 km relay	Team sprint
2006	26	51	—	41	41	17	—
2010	30	57	43	41	—	—	—
2018	38	50	56	28	39	—	—

=== World Championships ===
Year	Age	10 km individual	15 km skiathlon	30 km mass start	Sprint	4 × 5 km relay	Team sprint
2007	27	56	—	—	43	15	—
2009	29	41	45	34	—	14	—
2013	33	—	—	31	—	13	—
2015	35	—	—	—	—	13	—
2017	37	—	—	43	—	14	—

=== World Cup ===
==== Season standings ====
Season	Age	Discipline standings			Ski Tour standings		
Season	Age	Overall	Distance	Sprint	Nordic Opening	Tour de Ski	World Cup Final
2006	26	NC	NC	NC	—N/a	—N/a	—N/a
2007	27	95	69	NC	—N/a	—	—N/a
2008	28	NC	NC	NC	—N/a	41	41
2009	29	NC	NC	NC	—N/a	36	—
2010	30	NC	NC	NC	—N/a	—	—
2012	32	NC	NC	NC	—	DNF	—
2013	33	NC	NC	NC	48	46	—
2014	34	NC	NC	NC	81	—	—
2015	35	NC	NC	—	—	—	—N/a
2017	37	NC	NC	—	—	—	—
2018	38	NC	NC	NC	—	—	—
