= Kikkan Randall =

American cross-country skier

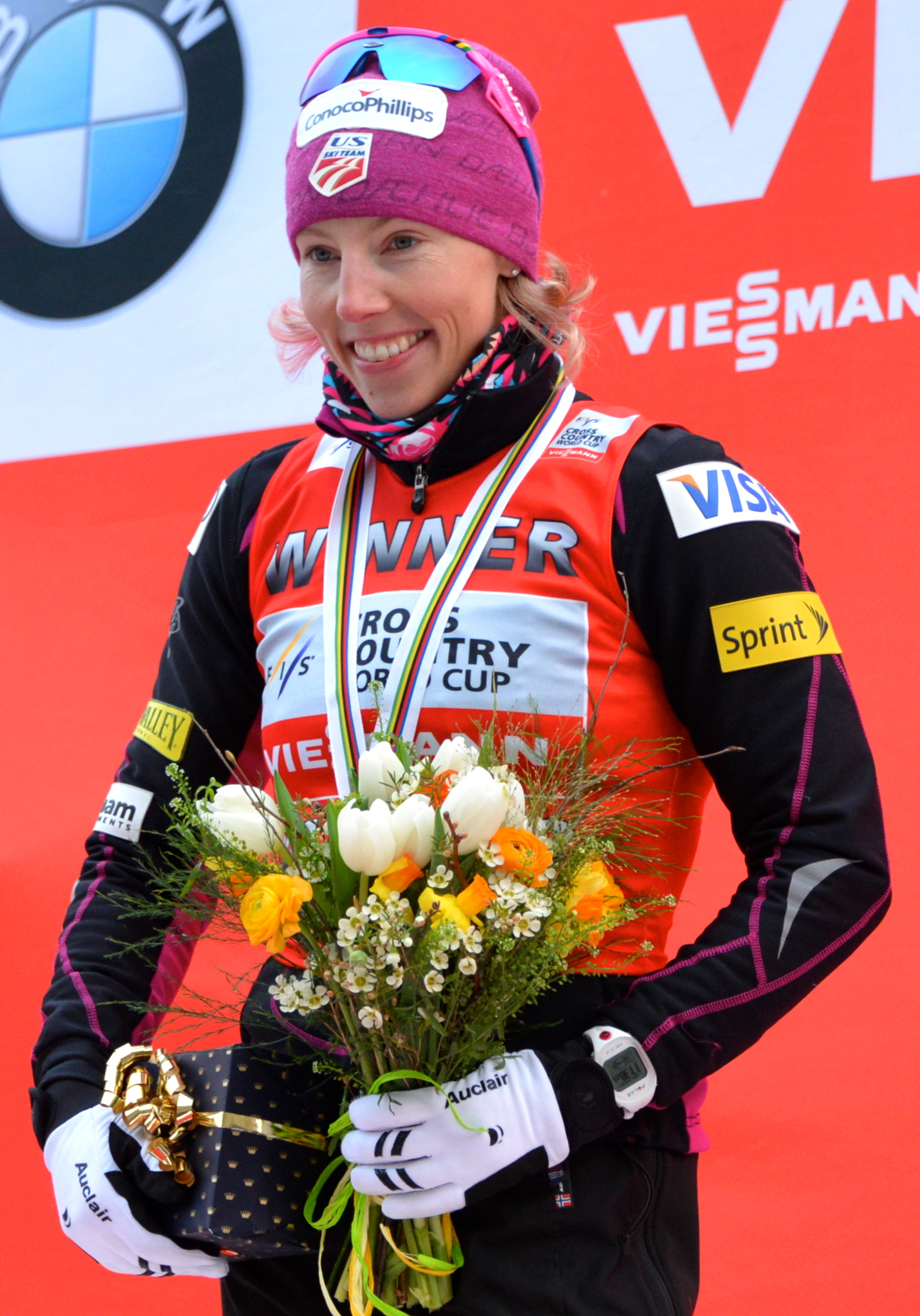
- Kikkan Randall after winning the Stockholm Royal Palace Sprint in March 2013

Personal information
- Nationality: United States
- Born: December 31, 1982 (age 43) Salt Lake City, Utah, USA
- Height: 5 ft 5 in (165 cm)

Sport
- Sport: Skiing
- Club: APU Ski Team

World Cup career
- Seasons: 14 – (2001, 2005–2015, 2017–2018)
- Indiv. starts: 214
- Indiv. podiums: 29
- Indiv. wins: 13
- Team starts: 19
- Team podiums: 5
- Team wins: 1
- Overall titles: 0 – (3rd in 2013)
- Discipline titles: 3 – (3 SP, 2012, 2013, 2014)
Medal record
Women's cross-country skiing
Representing United States
Olympic Games
Gold medal – first place	2018 Pyeongchang	Team sprint
World Championships
Gold medal – first place	2013 Val di Fiemme	Team sprint
Silver medal – second place	2009 Liberec	Individual sprint
Bronze medal – third place	2017 Lahti	Individual sprint

Kikkan Randall (born December 31, 1982) is an American Olympic champion cross-country skier. She has won 17 U.S. National titles, made 29 podiums on the World Cup, made five trips to the Winter Olympic Games and had the highest finish by an individual American woman at the World Championships, second in the Sprint in Liberec in 2009. She was the first American female cross-country skier to take a top ten finish in World Cup competition, to win a World Cup race and to win a World Cup discipline title. She won the silver medal in the individual sprint at the FIS Nordic World Ski Championships 2009 in Liberec, becoming the first American woman to win a medal in cross country skiing at the FIS Nordic World Ski Championships, and in 2013 teamed up with Jessie Diggins to win the first ever American FIS Nordic World Ski Championships gold medal in the team sprint. She and Diggins won the United States' first ever cross-country skiing gold medal at the Winter Olympics in women's team sprint at Pyeongchang in 2018.

== Early years ==
Randall's parents, Ronn and Deborah (née Haines) originally met at a California ski resort. Kikkan's name was the result of a compromise between her parents: her father wanted to name her Kikki, after Kiki Cutter, the first American to win a race on the Alpine Skiing World Cup, whilst her mother wanted to name her Meghan. Ronn started teaching Kikkan to ski one day after her first birthday. She is the niece of former cross-country skiing Olympians Betsy Haines (1980) and Chris Haines (1976).

Randall lived in Salt Lake while her mother attended law school at the University of Utah. In the mid-1980s, she moved to Anchorage, Alaska with her parents, where her younger siblings, Tanner and Kalli were born. Originally she had ambitions to race as an alpine skier, as well as to run for an NCAA Division I college. She ran a 6:06 minute mile in sixth grade at Scenic Park Elementary, but Kikkan's goal was to run a five-minute mile by high school. Kikkan Randall wanted to attend East High school because she wanted to wear red and blue just like her mom and aunt and that lead to Randall winning 10 state titles at East Anchorage High School — seven in track and three in cross-country running. She was announced the fastest girl on skis and she is the last Alaskan state speed-skiing champion. Randall took up cross-country skiing in 1998, when her track coach suggested using it as a means of keeping fit during the winter.

== Skiing career ==
=== Early career ===
After completing high school in Anchorage, Alaska at East High School, Randall decided to stay in her home town of Anchorage to start her undergraduate studies and train with the Alaska Pacific University Nordic Ski Center. Her sixth-place finish in the sprint at the 2001 Junior World Championships was the best ever result by an American woman. Randall made her Olympic debut as a 19-year-old at the 2002 Winter Olympics in Salt Lake City and finished 44th in the inaugural Olympic individual sprint. In January 2006, Randall returned to Soldier Hollow, Utah, the site of the 2002 Olympic cross-country competition, and won national titles in the 5-kilometer freestyle, the 10-km classical and the sprint. At the 2005 World Championships in Oberstdorf, Germany, she finished 30th in the individual sprint.

=== 2006–2011 ===
At the 2006 Winter Olympics, Randall finished ninth in the Olympic Sprint, the best ever Olympic result in cross-country skiing by an American woman. Shortly thereafter, she finished fifth in a World Cup sprint. On January 21, 2007, she captured bronze in the women's 1.2-kilometer sprint in Rybinsk, Russia, the best ever cross-country World Cup result by an American woman. Later that calendar year, in the following season, she took the first World Cup win for an American female skier since the introduction of women's competition in 1978 in another 1.2 kilometre sprint at the same venue.

Kikkan won a silver medal in February 2009, at the Nordic Skiing World Championship for the 1.3 Kilometer sprint; she was the first American to take home a World Championship medal since Bill Koch's win in 1982. In January 2010, Randall qualified for the 2010 Winter Olympics, where she earned a US best finish of sixth in the team sprint and her best individual finish of eighth in the individual sprint event. In the 2010-11 season, she finished third in the Sprint World Cup standings.

=== 2011–2012 ===
Randall became the first American woman to win a World Cup discipline title in cross-country by topping the season's Sprint standings. Her season included wins in the World Cup freestyle sprints in Düsseldorf and Davos. She also finished fifth in the Overall World Cup that season.

=== 2012–2013 ===
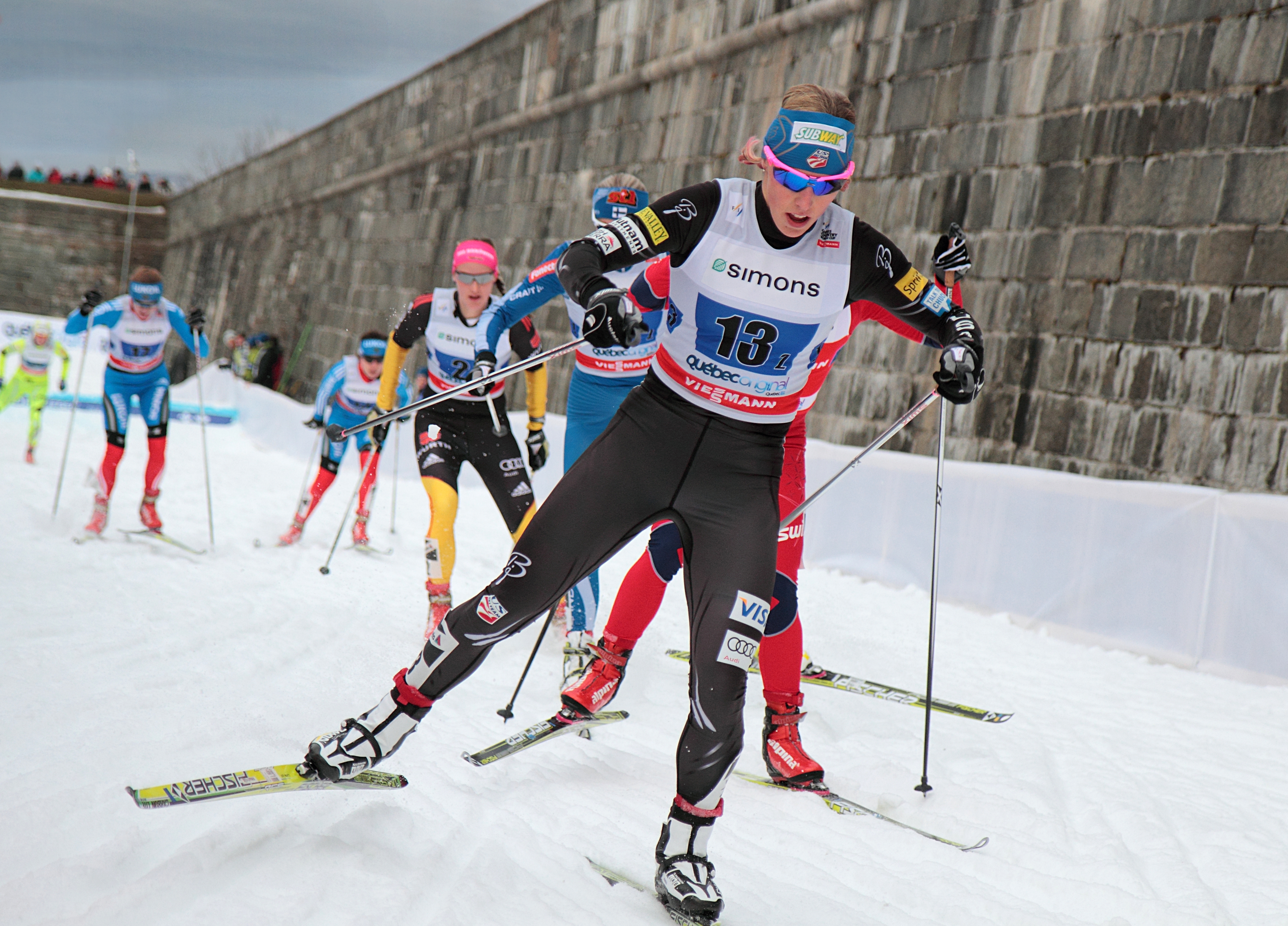
Randall in 2012

Randall won four World Cup freestyle sprint events, in Quebec, Val Mustair, Sochi, and Lahti. She also won the 3 km freestyle prologue of the Tour de Ski in Oberhof. She won a team freestyle sprint in Quebec with teammate Jessie Diggins. Randall finished first in the final World Cup sprint standings and third in the overall standings. Third place was the highest ever by a U.S. woman at the time. Randall, with Diggins, won the first-ever team sprint gold for U.S. women at the World Ski Championships.

=== 2013–2014 ===
Randall qualified for the U.S. Olympic team at Sochi, and went into the 2014 Winter Olympics as heavily favored to win the USA's first medal in cross-country skiing since 1976, but missed qualifying to advance in the sprint quarterfinals by .05 of a second. Subsequently, she suggested that her focus on peaking for the Olympics was disrupted by a back injury which she sustained whilst training in Davos in December 2013.

Randall topped the overall World Cup sprint standings for a third time. She won the World Cup freestyle sprint events in Nove Mesto, Szklarska Poreba, and Lahti.

=== 2014–2015 ===
Randall placed third in the Lahti freestyle sprint.

In October 2015 Randall announced that she was expecting her first child in April, and would take leave from competition in the 2015-16 season before returning in 2016-17 with a focus on the 2017 World Championships in Lahti and the 2018 Winter Olympics in Pyeongchang.

=== 2016–2017 ===
Upon returning to competition, Randall did not advance beyond qualifying in the first two World Cup Sprint competitions of the season. However, she made steady progress, and in January 2017 finished fifth in a World Cup Sprint in Falun, Sweden. Subsequently, at the 2017 World Nordic Ski Championships in Lahti, Finland, Randall took the bronze medal in the freestyle sprint, catching Hanna Falk in the last 100 metres to pip her for third place by 0.1 seconds, one place behind team-mate Diggins in second.

=== 2017–2018 ===
In December 2017 Randall took her first World Cup podium finish in almost three years when she finished third in a sprint in Davos, Switzerland.

During the 2018 Winter Olympics, she and Jessie Diggins became the first American cross-country skiers to win a gold medal by winning the women's team sprint at the Alpensia Cross-Country Centre in Pyeongchang, South Korea.

== Cross-country skiing results ==
All results are sourced from the International Ski Federation (FIS).

=== Olympic Games ===
- 1 medal – (1 gold)

Year	Age	10 km	15 km	Pursuit	30 km	Sprint	4 × 5 km relay	Team sprint
2002	19	—	—	60	—	44	—	—N/a
2006	23	53	—N/a	—	—	9	14	10
2010	27	—	—N/a	—	23	8	11	6
2014	31	—	—N/a	—	28	18	8	7
2018	35	16	—N/a	40	—	—	5	Gold

=== World Championships ===
- 3 medals – (1 gold, 1 silver, 1 bronze)

Year	Age	10 km	15 km	Pursuit	30 km	Sprint	4 × 5 km relay	Team sprint
2003	20	50	—	54	—	39	—	—N/a
2005	22	65	—N/a	—	29	DNF	14	
2007	24	—	—N/a	41	—	22	14	11
2009	26	26	—N/a	—	—	Silver	13	10
2011	28	32	—N/a	—	18	26	9	9
2013	30	30	—N/a	—	—	19	4	Gold
2015	32	15	—N/a	31	—	35	—	—
2017	34	26	—N/a	17	—	Bronze	4	—

=== World Cup ===
==== Season titles ====
- 3 titles – (3 sprint)

Season
Season	Discipline
2012	Sprint
2013	Sprint
2014	Sprint

==== Season standings ====
Season	Age	Discipline standings			Ski Tour standings		
Season	Age	Overall	Distance	Sprint	Nordic Opening	Tour de Ski	World Cup Final
2001	19	97	—N/a	70	—N/a	—N/a	—N/a
2005	23	NC	NC	NC	—N/a	—N/a	—N/a
2006	24	59	NC	34	—N/a	—N/a	—N/a
2007	25	30	NC	12	—N/a	—	—N/a
2008	26	32	NC	15	—N/a	—	—
2009	27	46	76	25	—N/a	—	49
2010	28	37	49	18	—N/a	—	17
2011	29	10	23	3rd place, bronze medalist(s)	19	21	16
2012	30	5	14	1st place, gold medalist(s)	6	10	8
2013	31	3rd place, bronze medalist(s)	10	1st place, gold medalist(s)	5	12	7
2014	32	6	17	1st place, gold medalist(s)	5	—	13
2015	33	43	71	17	58	DNF	—N/a
2017	35	36	45	20	—	DNF	—
2018	36	31	27	22	25	DNF	43

==== Individual podiums ====
- 13 victories – (11 WC, 2 SWC)
- 29 podiums – (22 WC, 7 SWC)

No.	Season	Date	Location	Race	Level	Place
1	2006–07	21 January 2007	Rybinsk, Russia	1.2 km Sprint F	World Cup	3rd
2	2007–08	16 December 2007	Rybinsk, Russia	1.2 km Sprint F	World Cup	1st
3	2009–10	14 March 2010	Oslo, Norway	1.0 km Sprint F	World Cup	2nd
4	2010–11	4 December 2010	Düsseldorf, Germany	0.9 km Sprint F	World Cup	2nd
5	2010–11	12 December 2010	Davos, Switzerland	1.4 km Sprint F	World Cup	3rd
6	2010–11	15 January 2011	Liberec, Czech Republic	1.3 km Sprint F	World Cup	1st
7	2010–11	20 February 2011	Drammen, Norway	1.2 km Sprint F	World Cup	1st
8	2011–12	3 December 2011	Düsseldorf, Germany	0.9 km Sprint F	World Cup	1st
9	2011–12	11 December 2011	Davos, Switzerland	1.5 km Sprint F	World Cup	1st
10	2011–12	4 January 2012	Toblach, Italy	1.3 km Sprint F	Stage World Cup	2nd
11	2011–12	14 January 2012	Milan, Italy	1.4 km Sprint F	World Cup	2nd
12	2011–12	17 February 2012	Szklarska Poręba, Poland	1.6 km Sprint F	World Cup	3rd
13	2012–13	24 November 2012	Gällivare, Sweden	10 km Individual F	World Cup	3rd
14	2012–13	1 December 2012	Rukatunturi, Finland	5 km Individual F	Stage World Cup	2nd
15	2012–13	8 December 2012	Quebec City, Canada	1.6 km Sprint F	World Cup	1st
16	2012–13	15 December 2012	Canmore, Canada	1.3 km Sprint F	World Cup	2nd
17	2012–13	29 December 2012	Oberhof, Germany	3 km Individual F	Stage World Cup	1st
18	2012–13	1 January 2013	Val Müstair, Switzerland	1.4 km Sprint F	Stage World Cup	1st
19	2012–13	1 February 2013	Sochi, Russia	1.25 km Sprint F	World Cup	1st
20	2012–13	9 March 2013	Lahti, Finland	1.55 km Sprint F	World Cup	1st
21	2012–13	22 March 2013	Falun, Sweden	2.5 km Individual F	Stage World Cup	2nd
22	2012–13	24 March 2013	Falun, Sweden	10 km Pursuit F	Stage World Cup	2nd
23	2013–14	29 November 2013	Rukatunturi, Finland	1.4 km Sprint C	Stage World Cup	2nd
24	2013–14	15 December 2013	Davos, Switzerland	1.5 km Sprint F	World Cup	2nd
25	2013–14	11 January 2014	Nové Město, Czech Republic	1.3 km Sprint F	World Cup	1st
26	2013–14	18 January 2014	Szklarska Poręba, Poland	1.5 km Sprint F	World Cup	1st
27	2013–14	1 March 2014	Lahti, Finland	1.55 km Sprint F	World Cup	1st
28	2014–15	7 March 2015	Lahti, Finland	1.5 km Sprint F	World Cup	3rd
29	2017–18	9 December 2017	Davos, Switzerland	1.5 km Sprint F	World Cup	3rd

==== Team podiums ====
- 1 victory – (1 TS)
- 5 podiums – (2 RL, 3 TS)

No.	Season	Date	Location	Race	Level	Place	Teammate(s)
1	2011–12	4 December 2011	Düsseldorf, Germany	6 × 0.9 km Team Sprint F	World Cup	2nd	Bjornsen
2	2011–12	15 January 2012	Milan, Italy	6 × 0.9 km Team Sprint F	World Cup	2nd	Diggins
3	2012–13	25 November 2012	Gällivare, Sweden	4 × 5 km Relay C/F	World Cup	3rd	Brooks / Stephen / Diggins
4	2012–13	7 December 2012	Quebec City, Canada	6 × 1.6 km Team Sprint F	World Cup	1st	Diggins
5	2013–14	8 December 2013	Lillehammer, Norway	4 × 5 km Relay C/F	World Cup	3rd	Bjornsen / Stephen / Diggins

== Other achievements ==
In 2009, Randall was elected to the International Ski Federation's Athletes Commission, which she served on for eight years. Subsequently, in 2018 she was elected to the International Olympic Committee's Athletes Commission, succeeding American ice hockey player Angela Ruggiero.

Randall defeated teammate Holly Brooks to win the Mount Marathon Race in 2011, following in the footsteps of her mother Debbie (who won the Race in 1975) and aunt Betsy (who won it three years in succession from 1979 to 1981).

Randall was inducted into the Alaska Sports Hall of Fame in 2011.

== Personal life ==
Randall was married to former Canadian ski racer Jeff Ellis. They divorced in October 2021. The couple have a son, Breck, who was born in April 2016.

In April 2008 she was diagnosed with the genetic blood clotting disorder Factor V Leiden after being hospitalized twice due to blood clots in her left leg.

Randall mixes studies at Alaska Pacific University with skiing for the APU Nordic Ski Center program run by Erik Flora, a former national-level ski racer.

In April 2018, Randall was diagnosed with breast cancer. She announced her diagnosis in July of that year on her social media accounts, as well as her plans to return to Anchorage to undergo chemotherapy.
