= Vučićević =

Vučićević (Serbian Cyrillic: Вучићевић) is a surname of Serbian origin. Notable people with the surname include:

- Božidar Vučićević (born 1998), Serbian volleyball player
- Dragan Vučićević (born 1973), Serbian journalist
- Milan Vučićević (born 1985), Serbian basketball player
- Nebojša Vučićević (born 1962), Serbian footballer and manager
- Nemanja Vučićević (born 1979), Serbian footballer
- Vanja Vučićević (born 1998), Serbian footballer
- Vedrana Vučićević (born 1985), Bosnian cross-country skier
- Vladan Vučićević (born 1955), Serbian politician
