= Silja Suija =

Estonian cross-country skier (born 1974)

Personal information
- Nationality: Estonia
- Born: 15 June 1974 (age 52) Tartu, then part of Estonian SSR, Soviet Union

Sport
- Sport: Skiing

World Cup career
- Seasons: 5 – (1994, 2005–2008)
- Indiv. starts: 18
- Indiv. podiums: 0
- Team starts: 5
- Team podiums: 0
- Overall titles: 0 – (91st in 2005)
- Discipline titles: 0

Silja Suija (born 15 June 1974) is an Estonian cross-country skier. She competed at the 1994 Winter Olympics and the 2006 Winter Olympics.

== Cross-country skiing results ==
All results are sourced from the International Ski Federation (FIS).

=== Olympic Games ===
Year	Age	5 km	10 km	15 km	Pursuit	30 km	Sprint	4 × 5 km relay	Team sprint
1994	19	39	—N/a	49	46	—	—N/a	12	—N/a
2006	31	—N/a	49	—N/a	—	—	—	17	—

=== World Championships ===
Year	Age	10 km individual	15 km skiathlon	30 km mass start	Sprint	4 × 5 km relay	Team sprint
2005	30	—	—	34	38	13	—

=== World Cup ===
==== Season standings ====
Season	Age	Discipline standings			Ski Tour standings	
Season	Age	Overall	Distance	Sprint	Tour de Ski	World Cup Final
1994	21	NC	—N/a	—N/a	—N/a	—N/a
2005	24	91	59	—	—N/a	—N/a
2006	25	NC	NC	NC	—N/a	—N/a
2007	26	NC	NC	NC	—	—N/a
2008	27	NC	NC	—	—	—
