= Cross-country skiing at the 2006 Winter Olympics – Women's sprint =

Women's sprint at the XX Olympic Winter Games
- Venue: Pragelato
- Dates: February 22, 2006
- Competitors: 66 from 28 nations

Medalists
1st place, gold medalist(s)		Chandra Crawford	Canada
2nd place, silver medalist(s)		Claudia Künzel	Germany
3rd place, bronze medalist(s)		Alyona Sidko	Russia

The Women's sprint cross-country skiing competition at the 2006 Winter Olympics in Turin, Italy was held on 22 February, at Pragelato.

Emilie Öhrstig was the defending World Champion, but she won in the classical style, and the last free style sprint in the World Championships (in 2003) was won by Marit Bjørgen. Yuliya Chepalova is defending Olympic champion. The most recent freestyle sprint event in the World Cup, however, was won by the Russian Alyona Sidko at 30 December 2005.

== Results ==
=== Qualifying ===
Sixty-six skiers completed the 1.1 kilometre course in the qualifying portion of the event, with the top thirty advancing to the quarterfinals.

Rank	Name	Country	Time	Notes
1	Beckie Scott	Canada	2:12.45	Q
2	Arianna Follis	Italy	2:12.90	Q
3	Lina Andersson	Sweden	2:13.29	Q
4	Claudia Künzel	Germany	2:13.64	Q
5	Alyona Sidko	Russia	2:14.54	Q
6	Petra Majdič	Slovenia	2:14.62	Q
7	Virpi Kuitunen	Finland	2:14.83	Q
8	Chandra Crawford	Canada	2:15.06	Q
9	Sara Renner	Canada	2:15.37	Q
10	Kikkan Randall	United States	2:15.63	Q
11	Aino-Kaisa Saarinen	Finland	2:15.75	Q
12	Anna Dahlberg	Sweden	2:15.91	Q
13	Ella Gjømle	Norway	2:16.02	Q
14	Manuela Henkel	Germany	2:16.04	Q
15	Madoka Natsumi	Japan	2:16.30	Q
16	Viktoria Lopatina	Belarus	2:16.36	Q
17	Marit Bjørgen	Norway	2:16.38	Q
18	Magda Genuin	Italy	2:16.41	Q
19	Britta Norgren	Sweden	2:16.43	Q
20	Olga Rocheva	Russia	2:16.43	Q
21	Emelie Öhrstig	Sweden	2:16.75	Q
22	Yuliya Chepalova	Russia	2:16.90	Q
23	Hilde G. Pedersen	Norway	2:17.17	Q
24	Kati Venäläinen	Finland	2:17.29	Q
25	Natalya Matveyeva	Russia	2:17.73	Q
26	Laurence Rochat	Switzerland	2:17.73	Q
27	Alena Procházková	Slovakia	2:17.75	Q
28	Nobuko Fukuda	Japan	2:17.82	Q
29	Olga Vasiljonok	Belarus	2:18.12	Q
30	Stefanie Böhler	Germany	2:18.14	Q
31	Nicole Fessel	Germany	2:18.35	
32	Seraina Mischol	Switzerland	2:18.83	
33	Barbara Moriggl	Italy	2:19.12	
34	Aurélie Perrillat	France	2:19.28	
35	Wendy Kay Wagner	United States	2:19.71	
36	Vita Yakymchuk	Ukraine	2:19.92	
37	Irina Terentjeva	Lithuania	2:20.08	
38	Elena Kolomina	Kazakhstan	2:20.28	
38	Lindsey Williams	United States	2:20.28	
40	Vesna Fabjan	Slovenia	2:20.34	
41	Tatjana Mannima	Estonia	2:20.44	
42	Elina Hietamäki	Finland	2:20.49	
43	Maryna Malets-Lisohor	Ukraine	2:20.79	
44	Justyna Kowalczyk	Poland	2:21.19	
45	Natalya Isachenko	Kazakhstan	2:21.22	
46	Oxana Yatskaya	Kazakhstan	2:22.12	
47	Émilie Vina	France	2:22.42	
48	Kaili Sirge	Estonia	2:22.42	
49	Amanda Ammar	Canada	2:22.78	
50	Eva Nývltová	Czech Republic	2:22.86	
51	Ekaterina Rudakova Bulauka	Belarus	2:23.19	
52	Esther Bottomley	Australia	2:23.55	
53	Katarína Garajová	Slovakia	2:23.98	
54	Piret Pormeister	Estonia	2:24.67	
55	Élodie Bourgeois Pin	France	2:24.77	
56	Man Dandan	China	2:25.16	
57	Song Bo	China	2:27.07	
58	Maja Kezele	Croatia	2:27.16	
59	Mónika György	Romania	2:27.53	
60	Daria Starostina	Kazakhstan	2:27.58	
61	Jia Yuping	China	2:30.03	
62	Elena Gorohova	Moldova	2:31.61	
63	Kelime Aydin	Turkey	2:33.33	
64	Lee Chae-won	South Korea	2:35.47	
65	Liu Liming	China	2:35.76	
66	Panagiota Tsakiri	Greece	2:43.28	

=== Quarterfinals ===
There were five quarterfinal races, each with six skiers. The top two in each heat advanced to the semifinals.

Quarterfinal 1

Rank	Seed	Athlete	Result	Notes
1	1	Beckie Scott (CAN)	2:16.6	Q
2	10	Kikkan Randall (USA)	2:17.8	Q
3	20	Olga Rocheva (RUS)	2:18.4	
4	30	Stefanie Boehler (GER)	2:18.5	
5	21	Emelie Öhrstig (SWE)	2:19.9	
6	11	Aino-Kaisa Saarinen (FIN)	2:20.7	

Quarterfinal 2

Rank	Seed	Athlete	Result	Notes
1	4	Claudia Künzel (GER)	2:15.5	Q
2	7	Virpi Kuitunen (FIN)	2:16.2	Q
3	14	Manuela Henkel (GER)	2:16.4	
4	17	Marit Bjørgen (NOR)	2:16.8	
5	27	Alena Procházková (SVK)	2:17.9	
6	24	Kati Venäläinen (FIN)	2:18.1	

Quarterfinal 3

Rank	Seed	Athlete	Result	Notes
1	5	Alyona Sidko (RUS)	2:17.7	Q
2	6	Petra Majdič (SLO)	2:17.7	Q
3	26	Laurence Rochat (SUI)	2:18.9	
4	15	Madoka Natsumi (JPN)	2:19.9	
5	16	Viktoria Lopatina (BLR)	2:24.8	
6	25	Natalya Matveyeva (RUS)	2:31.4	

Quarterfinal 4

Rank	Seed	Athlete	Result	Notes
1	12	Anna Dahlberg (SWE)	2:14.3	Q
2	2	Arianna Follis (ITA)	2:14.7	Q
3	19	Britta Norgren (SWE)	2:15.0	
4	9	Sara Renner (CAN)	2:15.6	
5	29	Olga Vasiljonok (BLR)	2:16.6	
6	22	Yuliya Chepalova (RUS)	2:16.6	

Quarterfinal 5

Rank	Seed	Athlete	Result	Notes
1	8	Chandra Crawford (CAN)	2:14.2	Q
2	13	Ella Gjømle (NOR)	2:15.7	Q
3	3	Lina Andersson (SWE)	2:16.0	
4	18	Magda Genuin (ITA)	2:17.9	
5	28	Nobuko Fukuda (JPN)	2:18.2	
6	23	Hilde G. Pedersen (NOR)	2:19.1	

=== Semifinals ===
There were two semifinal races, each with five skiers. The top two in each semifinal advanced to the A Final, to compete for the top four places, while the third and fourth-placed finishers advanced to the B Final, for places five through eight.

Semifinal 1

Rank	Seed	Athlete	Result	Notes
1	4	Claudia Künzel (GER)	2:15.5	Q
2	1	Beckie Scott (CAN)	2:15.8	Q
3	7	Virpi Kuitunen (FIN)	2:16.3	
4	6	Petra Majdič (SLO)	2:18.7	
5	10	Kikkan Randall (USA)	2:19.1	

Semifinal 2

Rank	Seed	Athlete	Result	Notes
1	8	Chandra Crawford (CAN)	2:13.4	Q
2	5	Alyona Sidko (RUS)	2:15.1	Q
3	2	Arianna Follis (ITA)	2:16.2	
4	13	Ella Gjømle (NOR)	2:16.4	
5	12	Anna Dahlberg (SWE)	2:18.9	

=== Finals ===
Chandra Crawford finished 0.7 seconds ahead of Claudia Künzel to win the Olympic gold medal in the women's cross-country sprint.

Final A

Rank	Seed	Athlete	Result
Gold medal	8	Chandra Crawford (CAN)	2:12.3
Silver medal	4	Claudia Künzel (GER)	2:13.0
Bronze medal	5	Alyona Sidko (RUS)	2:13.2
4	1	Beckie Scott (CAN)	2:14.7

Final B

Rank	Seed	Athlete	Result
5	7	Virpi Kuitunen (FIN)	2:18.1
6	13	Ella Gjømle (NOR)	2:18.2
7	2	Arianna Follis (ITA)	2:20.3
8	6	Petra Majdič (SLO)	2:21.5
