= Amanda Ammar =

Canadian cross-country skier

Personal information
- Nationality: Canada
- Born: 6 February 1986 (age 40) St. Albert, Alberta, Canada

Sport
- Sport: Skiing
- Club: Canmore Nordic Ski Club

World Cup career
- Seasons: 5 – (2006–2009, 2013)
- Indiv. starts: 14
- Indiv. podiums: 0
- Team starts: 2
- Team podiums: 0
- Overall titles: 0 – (117th in 2006)
- Discipline titles: 0
- Updated on 25 January 2019

Amanda Ammar (born 6 February 1986) is a Canadian cross-country skier.

Ammar made her World Cup debut in 2005. Her best finish to date came in that year, when she teamed with Perianne Jones to finish 17th in the team sprint in Canmore. Her top individual performance came at the same event, a 27th place in the women's 15 km mass start.

Ammar competed in three events at the 2006 Olympics in Turin. She finished 49th in the qualifying portion of the sprint, failing to advance to the quarterfinals, and also was a part of the Canadian relay team that finished 10th.

== Cross-country skiing results ==
All results are sourced from the International Ski Federation (FIS).

=== Olympic Games ===
Year	Age	10 km individual	15 km skiathlon	30 km mass start	Sprint	4 × 5 km relay	Team sprint
2006	20	54	—	—	49	10	—
2014	28	53	54	47	—	—	—

=== World Cup ===
==== Season standings ====
Season	Age	Discipline standings			Ski Tour standings		
Season	Age	Overall	Distance	Sprint	Nordic Opening	Tour de Ski	World Cup Final
2006	20	117	84	—	—N/a	—N/a	—N/a
2007	21	NC	NC	NC	—N/a	45	—N/a
2008	22	NC	NC	—	—N/a	—	—
2009	23	NC	NC	NC	—N/a	—	—
2013	27	NC	NC	—	—	—	—
