= Kaili Sirge =

Estonian cross-country skier (born 1983)

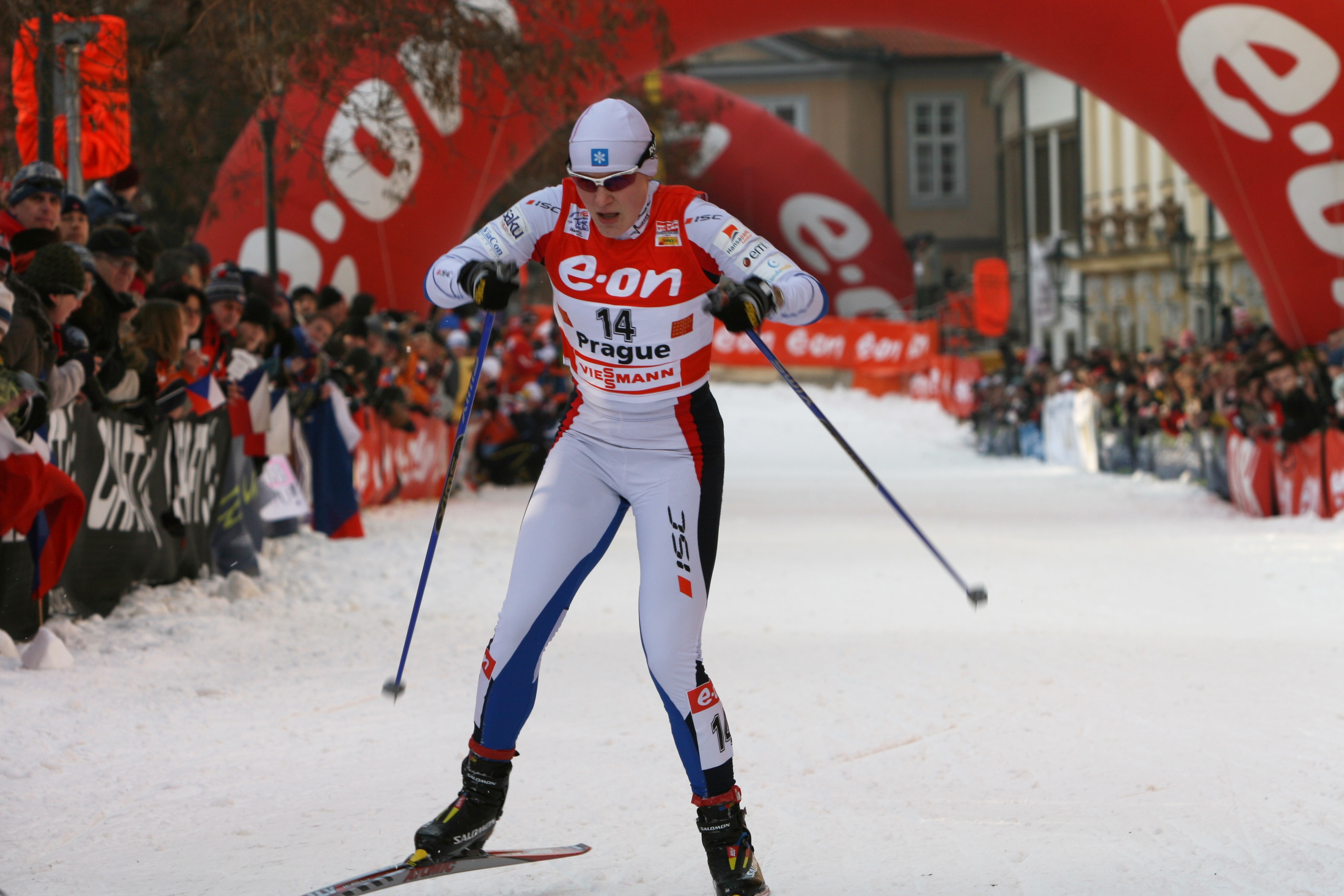
- Kaili Sirge in 2007

Personal information
- Nationality: Estonia
- Born: 23 July 1983 (age 43) Tamsalu, Estonia

Sport
- Sport: Skiing
- Club: Tamsalu AO Suusaklubi

World Cup career
- Seasons: 6 – (2005–2010)
- Indiv. starts: 39
- Indiv. podiums: 0
- Team starts: 12
- Team podiums: 0
- Overall titles: 0 – (91st in 2009)
- Discipline titles: 0

Kaili Sirge (born 23 July 1983) is an Estonian cross-country skier. She competed in five events at the 2006 Winter Olympics.

== Cross-country skiing results ==
All results are sourced from the International Ski Federation (FIS).

=== Olympic Games ===
Year	Age	10 km individual	15 km skiathlon	30 km mass start	Sprint	4 × 5 km relay	Team sprint
2006	22	56	—	DNF	47	17	15

=== World Championships ===
Year	Age	10 km individual	15 km skiathlon	30 km mass start	Sprint	4 × 5 km relay	Team sprint
2005	21	57	—	—	48	13	—
2007	23	58	—	—	41	15	18
2009	25	—	—	—	33	14	11

=== World Cup ===
Season Standings
Season	Age	Discipline standings			Ski Tour standings	
Season	Age	Overall	Distance	Sprint	Tour de Ski	World Cup Final
2005	21	NC	NC	NC	—N/a	—N/a
2006	22	NC	NC	NC	—N/a	—N/a
2007	23	NC	NC	NC	—	—N/a
2008	24	NC	NC	NC	DNF	—
2009	25	91	NC	63	—	DNF
2010	26	108	—	76	—	—
