= Biathlon Junior World Championships 2000 =

Biathlon event in Austria

The 2000 Biathlon Junior World Championships was held in Hochfilzen, Austria from February 8 to February 12, 2000. There was to be a total of eight competitions: sprint, pursuit, individual, mass start, and relay races for men and women.

== Medal winners ==
=== Junior Women ===
Event:	Gold:	Time	Silver:	Time	Bronze:	Time
12.5 km individual details	Irina Fomina; Russia	45:26.3 (0+1+0+0)	Sabrina Buchholz; Germany	46:56.3 (0+1+0+0)	Magda Rezlerová; Czech Republic	47:32.9 (0+3+0+0)
7.5 km sprint details	Sabrina Buchholz; Germany	23:01.4 (0+1)	Yulia Makarova; Russia	23:47.9 (1+1)	Tora Berger; Norway	23:55.1 (1+0)
10 km pursuit details	Sabrina Buchholz; Germany	31:20.3 (0+0+1+2)	Elena Khrustaleva; Russia	32:39.5 (0+1+2+2)	Nina Klenovska; Bulgaria	33:01.6 (0+0+1+1)
3 × 7.5 km relay details	Germany; Sabrina Buchholz; Carina Hartleb; Yvonne Forberger	1:17:07.0 (0) (0) (0) (0) (0) (0)	Russia; Yulia Makarova; Irina Fomina; Elena Khrustaleva	1:20:48.8 (0) (0) (0) (0) (3) (0)	China; Liu Yuanyuan; Huo Li; Cheng Xiaoni	1:21:03.6 (0) (1) (0) (0) (0) (1)

=== Junior Men ===
Event:	Gold:	Time	Silver:	Time	Bronze:	Time
15 km individual details	Fabian Mund; Germany	39:44.4 (1+0+0+0)	Andreas Birnbacher; Germany	40:48.3 (3+0+0+0)	Geir Ole Steinslett; Norway	41:50.6 (0+0+1+1)
10 km sprint details	Fabian Mund; Germany	25:44.6 (0+0)	Andreas Birnbacher; Germany	26:19.5 (0+1)	Daniel Graf; Germany	26:34.4 (1+0)
12.5 km pursuit details	Fabian Mund; Germany	35:31.9 (1+0+2+2)	Nikolay Kruglov; Russia	36:09.4 (0+0+1+1)	Andreas Birnbacher; Germany	36:26.5 (2+2+3+0)
4 × 7.5 km relay details	Germany; Fabian Mund; Kristian Meringer; Andreas Birnbacher; Daniel Graf	1:26:23.9 (0) (0) (0) (4) (2) (0) (0) (0)	Russia; Denis Saldimirov; Ivan Tcherezov; Nikolay Kruglov; Alexey Churine	1:27:56.2 (0) (0) (0) (0) (0) (1) (0) (0)	Norway; Kent Roger Guttormsen; Sveinung Strand; John Ola Ulset; Geir Ole Steinslett	1:31:28.5 (1) (0) (0) (0) (0) (3) (0) (0)

== Medal table ==
* Host nation (Austria)

Rank	Nation	Gold	Silver	Bronze	Total
1	Germany (GER)	7	3	2	12
2	Russia (RUS)	1	5	0	6
3	Norway (NOR)	0	0	3	3
4	Bulgaria (BUL)	0	0	1	1
4	China (CHN)	0	0	1	1
4	Czech Republic (CZE)	0	0	1	1
Totals (6 entries)		8	8	8	24
