= FIS Nordic World Ski Championships 2009 – Women's 10 kilometre classical =

Women's 10 km classical interval start at the FIS Nordic World Ski Championships 2009
- Venue: Liberec
- Date: 19 February 2009
- Competitors: 75 from 29 nations
- Winning time: 28:12.8

Medalists
gold medal	Aino-Kaisa Saarinen	Finland
silver medal	Marianna Longa	Italy
bronze medal	Justyna Kowalczyk	Poland

The Women's 10 kilometre classical at the FIS Nordic World Ski Championships 2009 was held on 19 February 2009 at 11:30 CET. A 5 km qualifying event took place on 18 February.

Organizing Committee chair Katerina Neumannová of the Czech Republic is two-time defending champion, but retired after the 2006–07 season. The top ten finishers of the 5 km event advanced to the 10 km event on the 19th. Saarinen won her first individual gold medal as a follow-up to her relay gold medal at the previous championships in Sapporo, leading at all time marks. Longa and Kowalczyk both earned their first medals at the championships. The top three 5 km qualifiers, Smyth, Li and Kashiwabara, finished 51st, 55th, and did not start respectively.

== Results ==
Rank	Bib	Athlete	Country	Time	Deficit
1st place, gold medalist(s)	76	Aino-Kaisa Saarinen	Finland	28:12.8	—
2nd place, silver medalist(s)	74	Marianna Longa	Italy	28:17.0	+4.2
3rd place, bronze medalist(s)	75	Justyna Kowalczyk	Poland	28:24.3	+11.5
4	73	Virpi Kuitunen	Finland	28:29.9	+17.1
5	69	Valentyna Shevchenko	Ukraine	28:41.8	+29.0
6	71	Kristin Størmer Steira	Norway	28:59.1	+46.3
7	66	Pirjo Muranen	Finland	29:17.5	+1:04.7
8	59	Masako Ishida	Japan	29:19.9	+1:07.1
9	64	Sara Renner	Canada	29:29.0	+1:16.2
10	68	Therese Johaug	Norway	29:33.7	+1:20.9
11	58	Olga Rocheva	Russia	29:39.3	+1:26.5
12	44	Anna Olsson	Sweden	29:42.4	+1:29.6
13	50	Svetlana Malahova	Kazakhstan	29:45.1	+1:32.3
14	48	Lina Andersson	Sweden	29:46.3	+1:33.5
15	70	Petra Majdič	Slovenia	29:49.4	+1:36.6
16	72	Marit Bjørgen	Norway	29:51.4	+1:38.6
17	57	Alyona Sidko	Russia	29:51.5	+1:38.7
18	62	Katrin Zeller	Germany	29:54.2	+1:41.4
19	55	Tatyana Zhambaeva	Russia	29:56.0	+1:43.2
20	56	Astrid Uhrenholdt Jacobsen	Norway	29:56.2	+1:43.4
21	60	Olga Tiagai	Russia	29:57.4	+1:44.6
22	54	Seraina Mischol	Switzerland	30:10.9	+1:58.1
23	37	Oxana Yatskaya	Kazakhstan	30:16.5	+2:03.7
24	63	Kateřina Smutná	Austria	30:19.8	+2:07.0
25	46	Kamila Rajdlová	Czech Republic	30:20.5	+2:07.7
26	41	Kikkan Randall	United States	30:25.5	+2:12.7
27	40	Karin Moroder	Italy	30:32.2	+2:19.4
28	49	Alena Sannikova	Belarus	30:47.4	+2:34.6
29	43	Kornelia Marek	Poland	30:49.1	+2:36.3
30	24	Elena Kolomina	Kazakhstan	30:49.2	+2:36.4
31	11	Li Hongxue	China	30:49.5	+2:36.7
32	67	Stefanie Böhler	Germany	30:54.5	+2:41.7
33	39	Lada Nesterenko	Ukraine	30:56.1	+2:43.3
34	29	Olga Vasiljonok	Belarus	30:57.6	+2:44.8
35	53	Laura Orgué	Spain	30:58.6	+2:45.8
36	28	Vita Yakymchuk	Ukraine	30:59.9	+2:47.1
37	51	Krista Lähteenmäki	Finland	31:02.1	+2:49.3
38	32	Hanna Brodin	Sweden	31:09.7	+2:56.9
39	36	Elena Antonova	Kazakhstan	31:11.4	+2:58.6
40	35	Morgan Arritola	United States	31:17.2	+3:04.4
41	42	Tatjana Mannima	Estonia	31:18.9	+3:06.1
42	52	Maryna Antsybor	Ukraine	31:21.8	+3:09.0
43	38	Ivana Janečková	Czech Republic	31:25.7	+3:12.9
44	19	Madoka Natsumi	Japan	31:30.0	+3:17.2
45	26	Eva Skalníková	Czech Republic	31:31.5	+3:18.7
46	23	Shayla Swanson	Canada	31:36.0	+3:23.2
47	31	Katherine Calder	New Zealand	31:42.0	+3:29.2
48	21	Perianne Jones	Canada	31:43.0	+3:30.2
49	27	Veronica Cavallar	Italy	31:47.2	+3:34.4
50	47	Eloide Bourgeois Pin	France	31:51.3	+3:38.5
51	7	Morgan Smyth	United States	31:54.1	+3:41.3
52	25	Caroline Weibel	France	31:56.8	+3:44.0
53	22	Vesna Fabjan	Slovenia	32:08.3	+3:55.5
54	30	Kaija Udras	Estonia	32:10.9	+3:58.1
55	6	Xin Li	China	32:20.8	+4:08.0
56	34	Eva Vrabcová-Nývltová	Czech Republic	32:23.2	+4:10.4
57	14	Laura Valaas	United States	32:23.4	+4:10.6
58	33	Laura Rohtla	Estonia	32:26.1	+4:13.3
59	10	Martyna Galewicz	Poland	32:34.7	+4:21.9
60	17	Nastassia Dubarezava	Belarus	32:36.3	+4:23.5
61	16	Paulina Maciuszek	Poland	32:40.2	+4:27.4
62	4	Yincui E	China	33:02.9	+4:50.1
63	12	Chae-Won Lee	South Korea	33:13.5	+5:00.7
64	15	Aimee Watson	Australia	33:26.8	+5:14.0
65	13	Mónika György	Romania	33:36.0	+5:23.2
66	1	Song Bo	China	34:01.6	+5:48.8
67	18	Antonia Grigorova	Bulgaria	34:29.6	+6:16.8
68	3	Fiona Hughes	United Kingdom	34:36.6	+6:23.8
69	20	Kelime Çetinkaya	Turkey	35:02.6	+6:49.8
70	9	Katarina Johansen	Slovakia	35:03.2	+6:50.4
71	2	Anrea Fancy	New Zealand	35:49.2	+7:36.4
—	45	Aurore Cuinet	France	DNF	—
—	8	Michito Kashiwabara	Japan	DNS	—
—	61	Karine Laurent Philippot	France	DNS	—
—	65	Anna Haag	Sweden	DNS	—
