= Liu Liming =

Chinese cross-country skier

Personal information
- Nationality: Chinese
- Born: 29 December 1986 (age 38)

Sport
- Sport: Cross-country skiing

Liu Liming (born 29 December 1986) is a Chinese cross-country skier. She competed in the women's sprint at the 2006 Winter Olympics.
