= Aurélie Perrillat-Collomb Storti =

French cross-country skier (born 1980)

Personal information
- Nationality: France
- Born: 3 May 1980 (age 46) Champagnole, France

Sport
- Sport: Skiing

World Cup career
- Seasons: 7 – (2000–2006)
- Indiv. starts: 64
- Indiv. podiums: 0
- Team starts: 16
- Team podiums: 0
- Overall titles: 0 – (46th in 2006)
- Discipline titles: 0

Aurélie Perrillat-Collomb Storti (born 3 May 1980) is a French cross-country skier. She competed at the 2002 Winter Olympics and the 2006 Winter Olympics.

== Cross-country skiing results ==
All results are sourced from the International Ski Federation (FIS).

=== Olympic Games ===
Year	Age	10 km	15 km	Pursuit	30 km	Sprint	4 × 5 km relay	Team sprint
2002	21	17	—	31	—	—	—	—N/a
2006	25	37	—N/a	—	—	34	9	11

=== World Championships ===
Year	Age	10 km	15 km	Pursuit	30 km	Sprint	4 × 5 km relay	Team sprint
2003	22	19	18	—	37	—	9	—N/a
2005	24	—	—N/a	19	25	—	9	6

=== World Cup ===
==== Season standings ====
Season	Age					
Season	Age	Overall	Distance	Long Distance	Middle Distance	Sprint
2000	19	NC	—N/a	—	NC	NC
2001	20	NC	—N/a	—N/a	—N/a	NC
2002	21	80	—N/a	—N/a	—N/a	NC
2003	22	94	—N/a	—N/a	—N/a	36
2004	23	61	45	—N/a	—N/a	56
2005	24	51	33	—N/a	—N/a	NC
2006	25	46	38	—N/a	—N/a	41
