= Morgan Smyth =

American cross-country skier (born 1986)

Personal information
- Nationality: United States
- Born: February 10, 1986 (age 40) Northampton, Massachusetts, United States

Sport
- Sport: Skiing

World Cup career
- Seasons: 1 – (2009)
- Indiv. starts: 3
- Indiv. podiums: 0
- Team starts: 1
- Team podiums: 0
- Overall titles: 0 – (107th in 2009)
- Discipline titles: 0

Morgan Smyth (born February 10, 1986) is an American cross-country skier who has competed since 2002. She won the 5 km qualification event at the FIS Nordic World Ski Championships 2009 in Liberec, Czech Republic. This allowed her to compete in the 10 km event the following day where she finished 51st.

Smyth best World Cup finish was 17th in the team sprint at Whistler Olympic Park, Canada in January 2009. She also had her best individual finish of 25th in the individual sprint at that same event. Morgan also helped the Wildcats complete their historic double podium sweep at the 2007 NCAA Skiing Championships and became the 2016 NMU Sports Hall of Fame Inductee

Smyth in a graduate of Northern Michigan University.

== Cross-country skiing results ==
All results are sourced from the International Ski Federation (FIS).

=== World Championships ===
Year	Age	10 km individual	15 km skiathlon	30 km mass start	Sprint	4 × 5 km relay	Team sprint
2009	23	51	—	—	52	—	—

=== World Cup ===
==== Season standings ====
Season	Age	Discipline standings			Ski Tour standings	
Season	Age	Overall	Distance	Sprint	Tour de Ski	World Cup Final
2009	23	107	NC	70	—	—
