= Cross-country skiing at the 2006 Winter Olympics – Women's 4 × 5 kilometre relay =

Women's 4 × 5 kilometre relay at the XX Olympic Winter Games
- Pictogram for cross country
- Venue: Pragelato
- Dates: 18 February 2006
- Competitors: 68 from 17 nations
- Winning time: 54:47.7

Medalists
1st place, gold medalist(s)		Natalya Baranova-Masalkina; Larisa Kurkina; Yuliya Chepalova; Yevgeniya Medvedeva-Arbuzova	Russia
2nd place, silver medalist(s)		Stefanie Böhler; Viola Bauer; Evi Sachenbacher-Stehle; Claudia Künzel	Germany
3rd place, bronze medalist(s)		Arianna Follis; Gabriella Paruzzi; Antonella Confortola; Sabina Valbusa	Italy

The Women's 4 × 5 kilometre relay cross-country skiing competition at the 2006 Winter Olympics in Turin, Italy was held on 18 February, at Pragelato.

Vibeke Skofterud, Hilde Gjermundshaug Pedersen, Kristin Størmer Steira and Marit Bjørgen of Norway were the defending World Champions, but finished third at a pre-Olympic World Cup event in Val di Fiemme, where a team representing Finland won. Germany were defending Olympic champions, with Claudia Künzel, Manuela Henkel, Viola Bauer and Evi Sachenbacher.

== Results ==
Each team used four skiers, with each completing racing over the same 5 kilometre circuit. The first two raced in the classical style, and the final pair of skiers raced freestyle.

The race was started at 09:45.

Rank	Bib	Team	Time	Deficit
1st place, gold medalist(s)	2	Russia; Natalya Baranova-Masalkina; Larisa Kurkina; Yuliya Chepalova; Yevgeniya Medvedeva-Arbuzova	54:47.7; 14:34.9; 14:41.8; 12:41.2; 12:49.8	–
2nd place, silver medalist(s)	4	Germany; Stefanie Böhler; Viola Bauer; Evi Sachenbacher-Stehle; Claudia Künzel	54:57.7; 14:33.9; 14:19.5; 12:50.6; 13:13.7	+10.0
3rd place, bronze medalist(s)	3	Italy; Arianna Follis; Gabriella Paruzzi; Antonella Confortola; Sabina Valbusa	54:58.7; 14:32.0; 14:26.1; 13:05.0; 12:55.6	+11.0
4	8	Sweden; Anna Dahlberg; Elin Ek; Britta Johansson Norgren; Anna-Karin Strömstedt	55:00.3; 14:23.9; 14:38.6; 12:55.0; 13:02.8	+12.6
5	1	Norway; Kristin Størmer Steira; Hilde Gjermundshaug Pedersen; Kristin Mürer Stemland; Marit Bjørgen	55:21.8; 14:23.5; 14:29.3; 13:03.7; 13:25.3	+34.1
6	6	Czech Republic; Helena Erbenová; Kamila Rajdlová; Ivana Janečková; Kateřina Neumannová	55:46.3; 14:40.8; 15:03.0; 13:16.6; 12:45.9	+58.6
7	5	Finland; Aino-Kaisa Saarinen; Virpi Kuitunen; Riitta-Liisa Lassila; Kati Venäläinen	55:55.8; 14:21.1; 14:30.4; 13:13.4; 13:50.9	+1:08.1
8	16	Ukraine; Kateryna Grygorenko; Tetyana Zavalíy; Vita Yakymchuk; Valentyna Shevchenko	56:36.3; 14:56.5; 15:01.8; 13:33.4; 13:04.6	+1:48.6
9	9	France; Aurélie Perrillat; Karine Philippot; Cécile Storti; Émilie Vina	56:41.4; 14:27.9; 14:31.2; 13:22.1; 14:20.2	+1:53.7
10	17	Canada; Milaine Thériault; Sara Renner; Amanda Ammar; Beckie Scott	56:49.8; 15:09.6; 14:04.5; 14:31.5; 13:04.2	+2:02.1
11	11	Switzerland; Seraina Mischol; Laurence Rochat; Natascia Leonardi Cortesi; Seraina Boner	56:52.4; 14:25.3; 15:03.4; 13:29.4; 13:54.3	+2:04.7
12	12	Japan; Nobuko Fukuda; Masako Ishida; Sumiko Yokoyama; Madoka Natsumi	56:57.8; 14:20.0; 15:22.8; 13:18.8; 13:56.2	+2:10.1
13	7	Kazakhstan; Oxana Yatskaya; Yevgeniya Voloshenko; Elena Kolomina; Svetlana Malahova-Shishkina	57:52.9; 15:02.6; 15:52.3; 13:41.8; 13:16.2	+3:05.2
14	15	United States; Wendy Kay Wagner; Kikkan Randall; Sarah Konrad; Rebecca Dussault	57:58.4; 15:00.0; 15:28.5; 13:43.5; 13:46.4	+3:10.7
15	10	Belarus; Alena Sannikova; Ludmila Korolik Shablouskaya; Ekaterina Rudakova Bulauka; Olga Vasiljonok	58:19.5; 14:54.0; 15:24.0; 14:09.9; 13:51.6	+3:31.8
16	14	China; Wang Chunli; Li Hongxue; Liu Yuanyuan; Song Bo	58:42.5; 14:58.0; 15:01.6; 13:47.5; 14:55.4	+3:54.8
17	13	Estonia; Piret Pormeister; Silja Suija; Kaili Sirge; Tatjana Mannima	1:00:24.4; 15:46.7; 16:03.5; 14:12.6; 14:21.6	+5:36.7
