= Vedrana Vučićević =

Bosnian cross-country skier (born 1985)

Personal information
- Nationality: French
- Born: 14 March 1985 (age 40); Sarajevo, Bosnia and Herzegovina

Sport
- Sport: Cross-country skiing

Vedrana Vučićević (born 14 March 1985) is a Bosnia and Herzegovina cross-country skier. She competed in the women's 10 kilometre classical at the 2006 Winter Olympics.
