= Cross-country skiing at the 2006 Winter Olympics – Women's team sprint =

Women's team sprint at the XX Olympic Winter Games
- Pictogram for cross country
- Venue: Pragelato
- Dates: February 14, 2006
- Competitors: 32 from 16 nations
- Winning time: 16:36.9

Medalists
1st place, gold medalist(s)		Anna Dahlberg & Lina Andersson	Sweden
2nd place, silver medalist(s)		Sara Renner & Beckie Scott	Canada
3rd place, bronze medalist(s)		Aino-Kaisa Saarinen & Virpi Kuitunen	Finland

The Women's team sprint cross-country skiing competition at the 2006 Winter Olympics in Turin, Italy was held on 14 February, at Pragelato. This was the first time the team sprint was contested in the Winter Olympics. Each race featured teams of two, with each skier completing 3 laps of a 1145 metre course.

This event had been held once previously at the World Championships, but then as a free technique event, which Hilde G. Pedersen and Marit Bjørgen won for Norway. The last classical style team sprint in the World Cup was held in Canmore on 18 December 2005 and won by Germany, with Manuela Henkel and Viola Bauer.

== Results ==
=== Semifinals ===
Eight teams were entered in the two semifinals, with the top five in each advancing to the final.

Semifinal 1

Rank	Country	Athletes	Time	Notes
1	Finland	Aino-Kaisa Saarinen; Virpi Kuitunen	17:16.8	Q
2	Canada	Sara Renner; Beckie Scott	17:19.3	Q
3	Italy	Arianna Follis; Gabriella Paruzzi	17:32.6	Q
4	Japan	Madoka Natsumi; Nobuko Fukuda	17:33.1	Q
5	Kazakhstan	Oxana Yatskaya; Elena Kolomina	17:36.3	Q
6	France	Élodie Bourgeois Pin; Aurélie Perrillat	17:54.5	
7	Slovenia	Vesna Fabjan; Maja Benedičič	18:53.5	
8	Ukraine	Maryna Malets-Lisohor; Tetyana Zavalij	19:14.3	

Semifinal 2

Rank	Country	Athletes	Time	Notes
1	Norway	Ella Gjømle; Marit Bjørgen	17:14.4	Q
2	Russia	Olga Rocheva; Alyona Sidko	17:32.3	Q
3	Sweden	Anna Dahlberg; Lina Andersson	17:33.5	Q
4	Germany	Evi Sachenbacher-Stehle; Viola Bauer	17:34.7	Q
5	United States	Wendy Kay Wagner; Kikkan Randall	17:51.4	Q
6	Czech Republic	Helena Erbenová; Kamila Rajdlová	18:11.6	
7	China	Wang Chunli; Jiang Chunli	18:18.4	
8	Estonia	Piret Pormeister; Kaili Sirge	19:13.6	

=== Final ===
The top three teams clearly separated themselves, with Sweden pulling away in the final metres to finish ahead of Canada and win the gold.

Rank	Country	Athletes	Time	Deficit
Gold medal	Sweden	Anna Dahlberg; Lina Andersson	16:36.9	—
Silver medal	Canada	Sara Renner; Beckie Scott	16:37.5	+0.6
Bronze medal	Finland	Aino-Kaisa Saarinen; Virpi Kuitunen	16:39.2	+2.3
4	Norway	Ella Gjømle; Marit Bjørgen	16:48.1	+11.2
5	Germany	Evi Sachenbacher-Stehle; Viola Bauer	17:03.5	+26.6
6	Russia	Olga Rocheva; Alyona Sidko	17:08.5	+31.6
7	Italy	Arianna Follis; Gabriella Paruzzi	17:24.8	+47.9
8	Japan	Madoka Natsumi; Nobuko Fukuda	17:27.6	+50.7
9	Kazakhstan	Oxana Yatskaya; Elena Kolomina	17:42.8	+1:05.9
10	United States	Wendy Kay Wagner; Kikkan Randall	18:06.9	+1:30.0
