= Peeter Kümmel =

Estonian cross-country skier (born 1982)

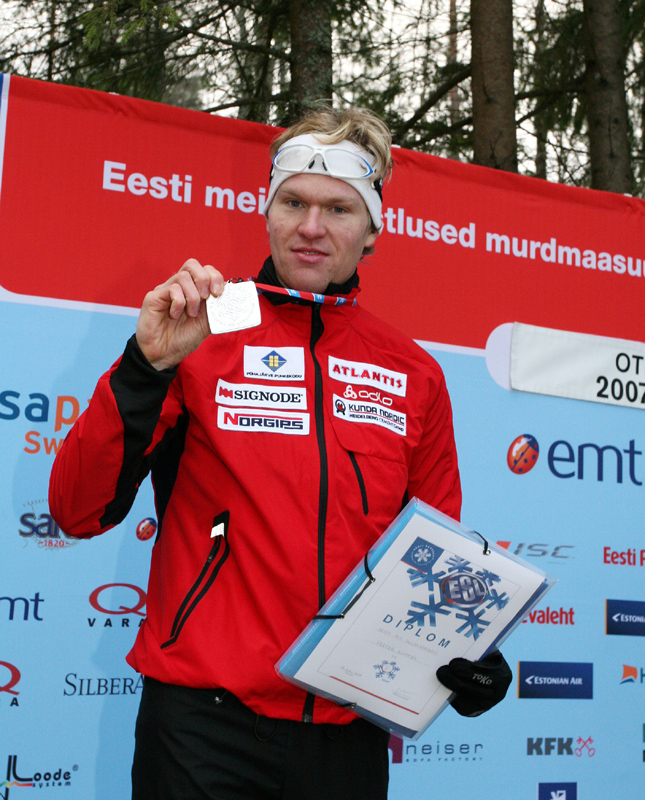
Peeter Kümmel in 2007

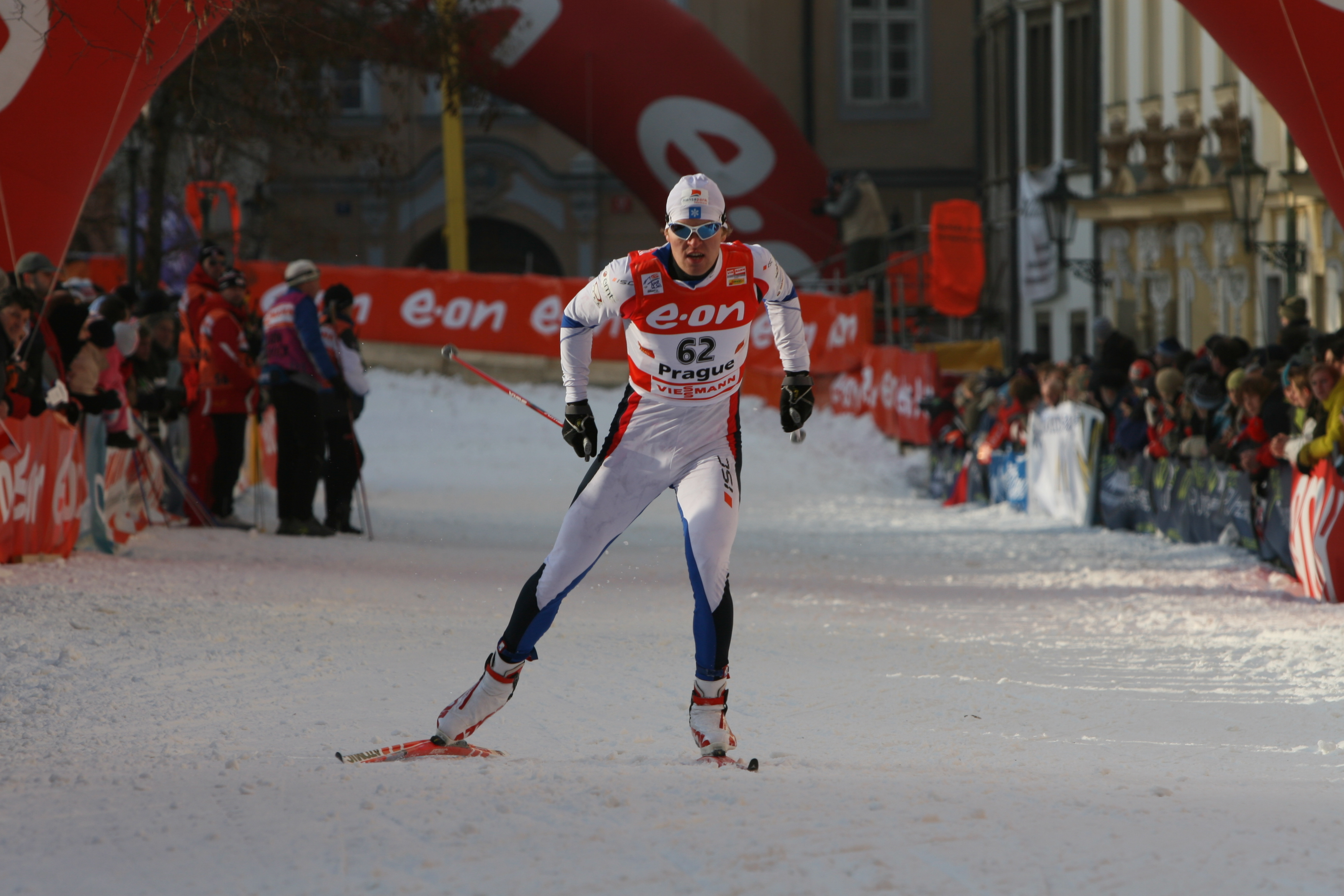
Peeter Kümmel in 2007

Peeter Kümmel (born 11 April 1982 in Tartu) is an Estonian cross-country skier who has competed since 2001.

Kümmel competed at the 2006 and 2010 Winter Olympics, the 2006–07, 2007–08 Tour de Ski, the 2007, 2009 and 2011 FIS Nordic World Ski Championships.

His best World Cup result is a 5th place from a sprint event in Otepää in 2008. His best World Championships result is a sixth place in the sprint in 2011, and his best Olympic result a 14th place in the sprint event in 2010.

== Personal ==
Kümmel was born in Tartu and currently lives in Otepää. His coach is Mati Alaver.
