= Laia Aubert =

Spanish skier (born 1986)

Personal information
- Nationality: Spanish
- Born: 10 May 1986 (age 38); Sant Quirze de Besora, Spain

Sport
- Sport: Cross-country skiing

Laia Aubert (born 10 May 1986) is a Spanish cross-country skier. She competed in two events at the 2006 Winter Olympics.
