= Jiang Chunli =

Chinese cross-country skier

Personal information
- Nationality: Chinese
- Born: 2 March 1981 (age 44)

Sport
- Sport: Cross-country skiing

Jiang Chunli (born 2 March 1981) is a Chinese cross-country skier. She competed in two events at the 2006 Winter Olympics.
