= Cross-country skiing at the 2006 Winter Olympics – Women's 30 kilometre freestyle =

Women's 30 kilometre freestyle at the XX Olympic Winter Games
- Venue: Pragelato
- Dates: February 24, 2006
- Competitors: 62 from 23 nations
- Winning time: 1:22:25.4

Medalists
1st place, gold medalist(s)		Kateřina Neumannová; Czech Republic
2nd place, silver medalist(s)		Yuliya Chepalova; Russia
3rd place, bronze medalist(s)		Justyna Kowalczyk; Poland

The Women's 30 kilometre freestyle cross-country skiing competition at the 2006 Winter Olympics in Turin, Italy, was held on 24 February, at Pragelato.

Marit Bjørgen was the defending World Champion, while the last 30 kilometre free style (with individual start) in the World Cup was won by Yuliya Chepalova on 28 February 2004. The event had never been held as a mass start at the Olympics, but the last 30 km (a classical individual start event) was won by Gabriella Paruzzi of Italy.

Veteran Kateřina Neumannová won her second medal at the Torino Olympics. Her daughter, Luci, greeted the exhausted Neumannová after she won. Newcomer Justyna Kowalczyk won the first ever Olympic medal in cross-country skiing for Poland, for either men or women.

== Results ==
The race was a 'mass start', with all 62 skiers starting at the same time. 11 skiers failed to finish the race.

Rank	Name	Country	Time
Gold medal	Kateřina Neumannová	Czech Republic	1:22:25.4
Silver medal	Yuliya Chepalova	Russia	1:22:26.8
Bronze medal	Justyna Kowalczyk	Poland	1:22:27.5
4	Kristin Størmer Steira	Norway	1:22:40.8
5	Gabriella Paruzzi	Italy	1:23:00.8
6	Claudia Künzel	Germany	1:23:02.1
7	Valentyna Shevchenko	Ukraine	1:23:07.9
8	Kristina Šmigun	Estonia	1:23:22.5
9	Olga Zavyalova	Russia	1:23:28.5
10	Sabina Valbusa	Italy	1:23:37.6
11	Karine Philippot	France	1:24:06.1
12	Arianna Follis	Italy	1:24:46.1
13	Evi Sachenbacher-Stehle	Germany	1:25:15.8
14	Petra Majdič	Slovenia	1:25:22.5
15	Oxana Yatskaya	Kazakhstan	1:25:30.5
16	Natascia Leonardi Cortesi	Switzerland	1:25:32.0
17	Aino-Kaisa Saarinen	Finland	1:25:41.8
18	Olga Rocheva	Russia	1:25:45.0
19	Elena Kolomina	Kazakhstan	1:26:06.4
20	Stefanie Böhler	Germany	1:26:19.2
21	Yevgeniya Medvedeva-Arbuzova	Russia	1:26:28.1
22	Vita Yakymchuk	Ukraine	1:26:32.2
23	Riitta-Liisa Lassila	Finland	1:26:55.4
24	Kristin Mürer Stemland	Norway	1:27:05.9
25	Chizuru Sontea	Japan	1:27:25.8
26	Ludmila Korolik Shablouskaya	Belarus	1:27:44.4
27	Ivana Janečková	Czech Republic	1:27:55.7
28	Britta Norgren	Sweden	1:28:21.9
29	Ella Gjømle	Norway	1:28:28.2
30	Anna-Karin Strömstedt	Sweden	1:28:29.4
31	Kamila Rajdlová	Czech Republic	1:28:38.6
32	Sarah Konrad	United States	1:28:39.2
33	Li Hongxue	China	1:28:49.8
34	Olga Vasiljonok	Belarus	1:29:22.8
35	Alena Sannikova	Belarus	1:29:30.4
36	Élodie Bourgeois Pin	France	1:29:37.6
37	Sumiko Yokoyama	Japan	1:29:41.3
38	Natalya Isachenko	Kazakhstan	1:30:04.3
39	Helena Erbenová	Czech Republic	1:30:20.6
40	Svetlana Malahova-Shishkina	Kazakhstan	1:30:41.5
41	Tatjana Mannima	Estonia	1:30:42.1
42	Kateryna Grygorenko	Ukraine	1:31:36.9
43	Rebecca Dussault	United States	1:31:43.3
44	Viktoria Lopatina	Belarus	1:31:47.3
45	Liu Yuanyuan	China	1:32:00.9
46	Huo Li	China	1:32:28.8
47	Abby Larson	United States	1:32:51.9
48	Nicole Fessel	Germany	1:34:06.2
49	Kelime Aydin	Turkey	1:34:07.2
50	Mónika György	Romania	1:35:25.4
	Virpi Kuitunen	Finland	DNF
	Lina Andersson	Sweden	DNF
	Kati Venäläinen	Finland	DNF
	Antonella Confortola	Italy	DNF
	Irina Terentjeva	Lithuania	DNF
	Maja Benedičič	Slovenia	DNF
	Lee Chae-won	South Korea	DNF
	Kaili Sirge	Estonia	DNF
	Man Dandan	China	DNF
	Lindsey Weier	United States	DNF
	Maryna Malets-Lisohor	Ukraine	DNF
	Milaine Thériault	Canada	DNS
