= Huo Li =

Chinese cross-country skier (born 1980)

Personal information
- Nationality: Chinese
- Born: 25 December 1980 (age 45)

Sport
- Sport: Cross-country skiing
Medal record
Women's biathlon
Junior World Championships
Bronze medal – third place	2000 Hochfilzen	3 × 7.5 km relay

Huo Li (born 25 December 1980) is a Chinese cross-country skier. She competed in two events at the 2006 Winter Olympics.
