= Liu Yuanyuan =

Chinese biathlete (born 1982)

Personal information
- Born: 7 March 1982 (age 44) Dalian, China

Sport
Medal record
Representing China
Women's cross-country skiing
Asian Winter Games
Bronze medal – third place	2011 Astana-Almaty	4×5 km relay
Women's biathlon
Asian Winter Games
Silver medal – second place	2011 Astana-Almaty	4×6 km relay
Junior World Championships
Bronze medal – third place	2000 Hochfilzen	3 × 7.5 km relay

Liu Yuanyuan (simplified Chinese: 柳圆圆; traditional Chinese: 柳圓圓; pinyin: Liǔ Yuányuán; born March 17, 1982, in Dalian) is a retired Chinese female biathlete and cross-country skier who represented China at the 2006 Winter Olympics in Turin.

During the 2006–07 FIS Cross-Country World Cup, Liu placed 4th at the 10 km freestyle race in Changchun. This landed her at 53rd place in the final World Cup ranking, making her the best Chinese cross-country skier of all time up to that point. Her record would stand for 15 years, until Wang Qiang became the first Chinese athlete to win a medal at the 2021-2022 World Cup.

Liu retired from cross-country skiing in 2011.
