= Viktoria Lopatina =

Belarusian cross-country skier (born 1981)

Viktoria Lopatina (born December 18, 1981) is a Belarusian cross-country skier who has been competing since 2000. She finished sixth in the team sprint at the 2007 FIS Nordic World Ski Championships in Sapporo and earned her best individual finish of 23rd in the sprint event at the 2003 championships in Val di Fiemme.

Lopatina's best individual finish at the Winter Olympics was 21st in the sprint event at Turin in 2006.

Her lone individual victory was in the sprint event at the 2007 Winter Universiade in Turin. Lopatina's best individual World cup finish was eighth in a sprint event in Germany in 2001.
