= Song Bo (skier) =

Chinese cross-country skier

Personal information
- Nationality: Chinese
- Born: 4 April 1985 (age 39)

Sport
- Sport: Cross-country skiing

Song Bo (born 4 April 1985) is a Chinese cross-country skier. She competed in four events at the 2006 Winter Olympics.
