= Yevgeniya Voloshenko =

Kazakhstani cross-country skier (born 1979)

Personal information
- Nationality: Kazakhstani
- Born: 3 April 1979 (age 46) Kokshetau, Kazakhstan

Sport
- Sport: Cross-country skiing

Yevgeniya Voloshenko (Евгения Анатольевна Волошенко, born 3 April 1979) is a Kazakhstani cross-country skier. She competed in three events at the 2006 Winter Olympics.
