= Mónika György =

Romanian cross-country skier (born 1982)

Mónika György (born July 13, 1982) is a Romanian cross-country skier of Hungarian ethnicity, who has competed since 2000. Competing in two Winter Olympics, she earned her best finish of 43rd in the 10 km event at the 2010 Winter Olympics in Vancouver.

György's best finish at the FIS Nordic World Ski Championships was 49th in the individual sprint event at Val di Fiemme in 2003.

Her best World Cup finish was 48th in a sprint event at Italy in 2004.
