= Olga Vasiljonok =

Belarusian cross-country skier (born 1980)

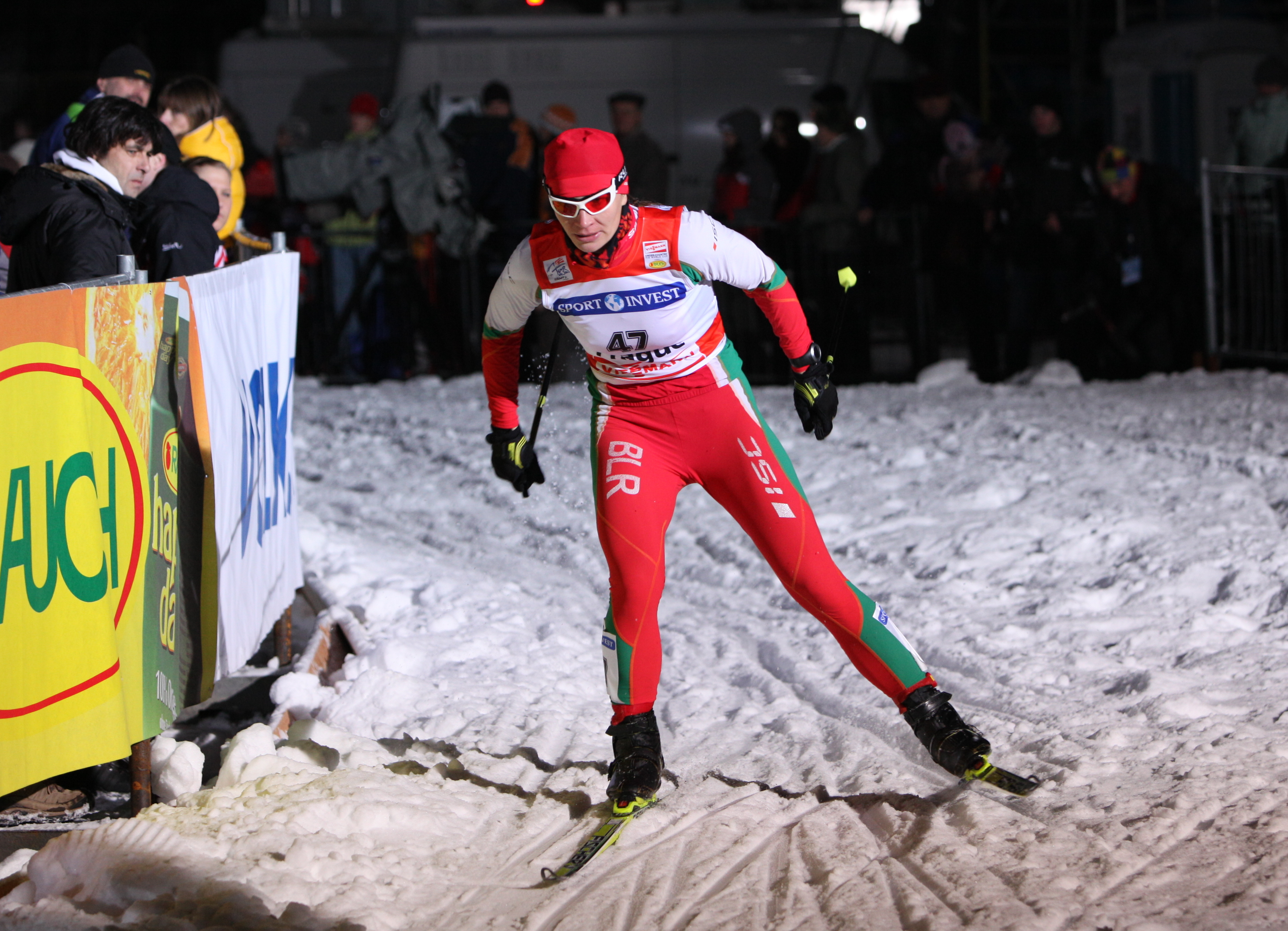
Olga Vasiljonok (2010)

Olga Vasiljonok (born 17 May 1980) is a Belarusian cross-country skier who has been competing since 2000. She finished sixth in the team sprint at the FIS Nordic World Ski Championships 2007 in Sapporo and earned her best individual finish of 17th in the individual sprint event at the 2009 championships in Liberec.

Vasiljonok's best individual finish at the Winter Olympics was 25th in the sprint at Turin in 2006.

She won three individual bronze medals in the 2007 Winter Universiade (Sprint, 7.5 km + 7.5 km double pursuit, 30 km). Vasiljonok's best individual World Cup finish was 11th in a sprint event in Germany in 2004.
