= Alena Sannikova =

Belarusian cross-country skier (born 1980)

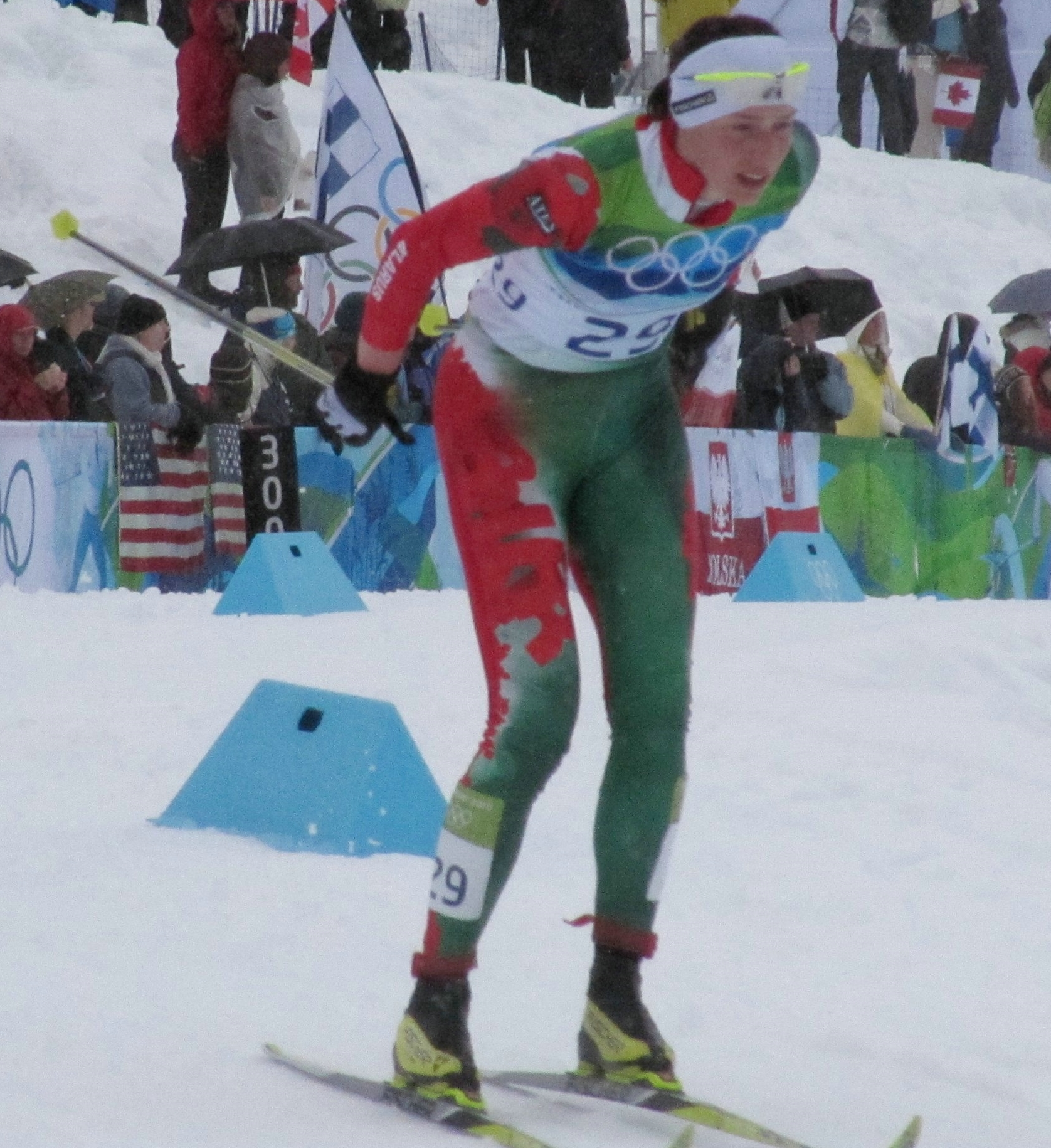
Alena Sannikova at the Ladies' 30 km mass start cross-country skiing classic on day 16 of the 2010 Vancouver Winter Olympics.

Alena Sannikova (born June 12, 1980) is a Belarusian cross-country skier who has competed since 1998. Competing in two Winter Olympics, she earned her best finish of 11th in the 4 x 5 km relay at Vancouver in 2010 while earning her best individual finish of 29th in the 10 km event at Turin in 2006.

Sannikova's best finish at the FIS Nordic World Ski Championships was tenth twice in the 4 x 5 km relay (2005, 2009) while her best individual finish was 22nd in the 7.5 km + 7.5 km double pursuit at Liberec in 2009.

Her best World Cup finish was 13th twice in the 4 x 5 km relay (2004, 2006) while her best individual finish was 19th in a 10 km event in Sweden in 2008.
