= United States at the 2006 Winter Olympics =

- Flag of the United States
- IOC code: USA
- NOC: United States Olympic Committee

in Turin
- Competitors: 204 (117 men and 87 women) in 8 sports
- Flag bearers: Chris Witty (opening); Joey Cheek (closing)
- Medals Ranked 2nd: Gold 9 Silver 9 Bronze 7 Total 25

Winter Olympics appearances (overview)
- 1924; 1928; 1932; 1936; 1948; 1952; 1956; 1960; 1964; 1968; 1972; 1976; 1980; 1984; 1988; 1992; 1994; 1998; 2002; 2006; 2010; 2014; 2018; 2022; 2026

The United States sent 204 athletes to the 2006 Winter Olympics in Turin, Italy. Chris Witty, a four-time Olympian, who competed in both Summer and Winter games, and won a gold medal in speed skating at the 2002 Games, served as the flag bearer at the opening ceremonies. Speed skater Joey Cheek, who won gold in the 500 m and silver in the 1000 m, was the flag bearer at the closing ceremonies. One athlete, Sarah Konrad, became the first American woman to compete in two different disciplines at the same Winter Olympics – biathlon and cross-country skiing.

While the United States' total medal count was down from the 2002 Winter Olympics, there were many highlights to the Games. Pete Fenson led the U.S. Curling team to a bronze medal, their first curling medal ever won. Speed skater Shani Davis became the first athlete of African descent from any country to win an individual gold medal. He won gold in the 1,000 m and followed that with a silver medal in the 1,500 m. Ice dancers Tanith Belbin and Benjamin Agosto won America's first figure skating ice dancing medal in 30 years.

== Medalists ==
The following U.S. competitors won medals at the games. In the by discipline sections below, medalists' names are bolded.

Medal	Name	Sport	Event	Date
Gold	Chad Hedrick	Speed skating	Men's 5000 meters	February 11
Gold	Shaun White	Snowboarding	Men's halfpipe	February 12
Gold	Hannah Teter	Snowboarding	Women's halfpipe	February 13
Gold	Joey Cheek	Speed skating	Men's 500 meters	February 13
Gold	Ted Ligety	Alpine skiing	Men's combined	February 14
Gold	Seth Wescott	Snowboarding	Men's snowboard cross	February 16
Gold	Shani Davis	Speed skating	Men's 1000 meters	February 18
Gold	Julia Mancuso	Alpine skiing	Women's giant slalom	February 24
Gold	Apolo Ohno	Short track speed skating	Men's 500 meters	February 25
Silver	Danny Kass	Snowboarding	Men's halfpipe	February 12
Silver	Gretchen Bleiler	Snowboarding	Women's halfpipe	February 13
Silver	Lindsey Jacobellis	Snowboarding	Women's snowboard cross	February 17
Silver	Joey Cheek	Speed skating	Men's 1000 meters	February 18
Silver	Benjamin Agosto; Tanith Belbin	Figure skating	Ice dance	February 20
Silver	Valerie Fleming; Shauna Rohbock	Bobsleigh	Two-woman	February 21
Silver	Shani Davis	Speed skating	Men's 1500 meters	February 21
Silver	Sasha Cohen	Figure skating	Women's singles	February 23
Silver	Chad Hedrick	Speed skating	Men's 10,000 meters	February 24
Bronze	Toby Dawson	Freestyle skiing	Men's moguls	February 15
Bronze	Apolo Ohno	Short track speed skating	Men's 1000 meters	February 18
Bronze	United States national women's ice hockey team: Caitlin Cahow; Julie Chu; Natalie Darwitz; Pam Dreyer; Tricia Dunn-Luoma; Molly Engstrom; Chanda Gunn; Jamie Hagerman; Kim Insalaco; Kathleen Kauth; Courtney Kennedy; Katie King; Kristin King; Sarah Parsons; Jenny Potter; Helen Resor; Angela Ruggiero; Kelly Stephens; Lyndsay Wall; Krissy Wendell	Ice hockey	Women's tournament	February 20
Bronze	Chad Hedrick	Speed skating	Men's 1500 meters	February 21
Bronze	Rosey Fletcher	Snowboarding	Women's parallel giant slalom	February 23
Bronze	Scott Baird; Pete Fenson; Joseph Polo; Shawn Rojeski; John Shuster	Curling	Men's tournament	February 24
Bronze	Alex Izykowski; J. P. Kepka; Apolo Ohno; Rusty Smith	Short track speed skating	Men's 5000 meter relay	February 25

Medals by sport
Sport	1st place, gold medalist(s)	2nd place, silver medalist(s)	3rd place, bronze medalist(s)	Total
Snowboarding	3	3	1	**7**
Speed skating	3	3	1	**7**
Alpine skiing	2	0	0	**2**
Short track speed skating	1	0	2	**3**
Figure skating	0	2	0	**2**
Bobsled	0	1	0	**1**
Curling	0	0	1	**1**
Freestyle skiing	0	0	1	**1**
Ice hockey	0	0	1	**1**
Total	9	9	7	25

Medals by date
Day	Date	1st place, gold medalist(s)	2nd place, silver medalist(s)	3rd place, bronze medalist(s)	Total
1	February 11	1	0	0	**1**
2	February 12	1	1	0	**2**
3	February 13	2	1	0	**3**
4	February 14	1	0	0	**1**
5	February 15	0	0	1	**1**
6	February 16	1	0	0	**1**
7	February 17	0	1	0	**1**
8	February 18	1	1	1	**3**
10	February 20	0	1	1	**2**
11	February 21	0	2	1	**3**
13	February 23	0	1	1	**2**
14	February 24	1	1	1	**3**
15	February 25	1	0	1	**2**
Total		9	9	7	25

Medals by gender
Gender	1st place, gold medalist(s)	2nd place, silver medalist(s)	3rd place, bronze medalist(s)	Total	Percentage
Male	7	4	5	**16**	64%
Female	2	4	2	**8**	32%
Mixed	0	1	0	**1**	4%
Total	9	9	7	25	100%

Multiple medalists
Name	Sport	1st place, gold medalist(s)	2nd place, silver medalist(s)	3rd place, bronze medalist(s)	Total
Chad Hedrick	Speed skating	1	1	1	**3**
Apolo Ohno	Short track speed skating	1	0	2	**3**
Shani Davis	Speed skating	1	1	0	**2**
Joey Cheek	Speed skating	1	0	1	**2**

== Alpine skiing ==
The American alpine ski team fell short of its self-proclaimed goal of eight medals, earning only two in Turin, both gold. Bode Miller, who won two gold medals at the 2005 World Championships, failed to medal in Turin, but the men's team still earned a gold medal, as Ted Ligety took a surprise victory in the combined. The other medal came from Julia Mancuso, who put together two strong runs to win the women's giant slalom.

Men

Athlete	Event	Run 1	Run 2	Run 3	Total	Rank
Scott Macartney	Downhill	—N/a			1:50.68	15
Bode Miller	Downhill	—N/a			1:49.93	5
Steven Nyman	Downhill	—N/a			1:50.88	19
Daron Rahlves	Downhill	—N/a			1:50.33	10
Ted Ligety	Combined	1:41.42	44.09	43.84	3:09.35	1st place, gold medalist(s)
Scott Macartney	Combined	1:40.06	46.82	46.17	3:13.05	16
Bode Miller	Combined	1:38.36	DSQ			
Steven Nyman	Combined	1:40.19	47.14	55.35	3:22.68	29
Scott Macartney	Super-G	—N/a			1:31.23	7
Bode Miller	Super-G	—N/a			DNF	
Steven Nyman	Super-G	—N/a			1:36.22	43
Daron Rahlves	Super-G	—N/a			1:31.37	9
Ted Ligety	Giant slalom	DNF		—N/a	DNF	
Bode Miller	Giant slalom	1:17.58	1:18.48	—N/a	2:36.06	6
Daron Rahlves	Giant slalom	DNF		—N/a	DNF	
Erik Schlopy	Giant slalom	1:18.34	1:19.22	—N/a	2:37.56	13
James Cochran	Slalom	54.49	51.19	—N/a	1:45.68	12
Chip Knight	Slalom	54.71	51.55	—N/a	1:46.26	18
Ted Ligety	Slalom	DSQ		—N/a	DSQ	
Bode Miller	Slalom	DNF		—N/a	DNF	

Women

Athlete	Event	Run 1	Run 2	Run 3	Total	Rank
Kirsten Clark	Downhill	—N/a			1:59.07	21
Stacey Cook	Downhill	—N/a			1:58.70	19
Lindsey Kildow	Downhill	—N/a			1:57.78	8
Julia Mancuso	Downhill	—N/a			1:57.71	7
Lindsey Kildow	Combined	39.86	DNF			
Julia Mancuso	Combined	39.79	44.81	1:30.84	2:55.44	9
Kaylin Richardson	Combined	40.45	44.55	1:31.83	2:56.83	17
Resi Stiegler	Combined	39.08	44.36	1:32.35	2:55.79	11
Kirsten Clark	Super-G	—N/a			1:33.98	14
Lindsey Kildow	Super-G	—N/a			1:33.42	7
Libby Ludlow	Super-G	—N/a			1:35.01	28
Julia Mancuso	Super-G	—N/a			1:33.72	11
Stacey Cook	Giant slalom	1:03.35	1:11.09	—N/a	2:14.44	23
Lindsey Kildow	Giant slalom	DNS		—N/a	DNS	
Julia Mancuso	Giant slalom	1:00.89	1:08.30	—N/a	2:09.19	1st place, gold medalist(s)
Sarah Schleper	Giant slalom	1:02.01	DNF	—N/a	DNF	
Lindsey Kildow	Slalom	43.92	47.66	—N/a	1:31.58	14
Kristina Koznick	Slalom	45.72	DNS	—N/a	DNF	
Sarah Schleper	Slalom	43.61	47.77	—N/a	1:31.38	10
Resi Stiegler	Slalom	44.15	47.33	—N/a	1:31.48	12

== Biathlon ==
The top finish from the U.S. biathlon team came from Jay Hakkinen, who was 10th in the men's individual event.

Men

Athlete	Event	Time	Misses	Rank
Lowell Bailey	Sprint	29:02.0	3	47
Tim Burke	Sprint	28:27.8	3	36
Jay Hakkinen	Sprint	31:22.2	6	79
Jeremy Teela	Sprint	29:32.7	4	61
Lowell Bailey	Pursuit	41:31.30	9	48
Tim Burke	Pursuit	39:17.66	7	36
Lowell Bailey	Individual	58:45.1	3	27
Tim Burke	Individual	1:01:55.0	7	58
Jay Hakkinen	Individual	56:10.9	3	10
Jeremy Teela	Individual	1:01:03.3	5	51
Jay Hakkinen	Mass start	48:29.66	1	13
Lowell Bailey; Tim Burke; Jay Hakkinen; Jeremy Teela	Relay	1:24:23.4	18	9

Women

Athlete	Event	Time	Misses	Rank
Tracy Barnes	Sprint	26:47.9	2	71
Sarah Konrad	Sprint	27:30.6	8	75
Rachel Steer	Sprint	24:29.6	1	35
Carolyn Treacy	Sprint	28:18.7	4	80
Rachel Steer	Pursuit	43:32.83	3	39
Lanny Barnes	Individual	59:46.2	4	64
Tracy Barnes	Individual	57:58.0	1	57
Sarah Konrad	Individual	59:33.1	10	62
Rachel Steer	Individual	55:48.3	3	41
Lanny Barnes; Tracy Barnes; Rachel Steer; Carolyn Treacy	Relay	1:25:20.3	11	15

== Bobsleigh ==
Shauna Rohbock and Valerie Fleming, bronze medalists at the 2005 World Championships, had four strong runs to earn the United States' only bobsleigh medal in Turin.

Men

Athlete	Event	Run 1		Run 2		Run 3		Run 4		Total	
Athlete	Event	Time	Rank	Time	Rank	Time	Rank	Time	Rank	Time	Rank
Todd Hays^{D} Pavle Jovanovic	Two-man	55.81	7	55.72	3	56.31	7	56.88	7	3:44.72	7
Steve Holcomb^{D} Bill Schuffenhauer	Two-man	56.16	13	55.96	12	57.05	17	57.04	12	3:46.21	14
Todd Hays^{D} Pavle Jovanovic; Brock Kreitzburg; Steve Mesler	Four-man	55.43	5	55.56	7	55.04	6	55.41	10	3:41.44	7
Steve Holcomb^{D} Bill Schuffenhauer; Lorenzo Smith III; Curtis Tomasevicz	Four-man	55.46	6	55.50	6	55.14	7	55.26	6	3:41.36	6

Women

Athlete	Event	Run 1		Run 2		Run 3		Run 4		Total	
Athlete	Event	Time	Rank	Time	Rank	Time	Rank	Time	Rank	Time	Rank
Vonetta Flowers; Jean Prahm^{D}	Two-woman	57.97	10	57.67	4	57.81	4	58.33	7	3:51.78	6
Valerie Fleming; Shauna Rohbock^{D}	Two-woman	57.37	3	57.65	2	57.78	3	57.89	3	3:50.69	2nd place, silver medalist(s)

^{D} - Driver of the sled

== Cross-country skiing ==
Two skiers, Kikkan Randall and Leif-Orin Zimmermann, were suspended for health reasons for the first five days of competition after showing abnormally high values of hemoglobin in their blood. Randall eventually was cleared to compete, participating in the women's relay and finishing 53rd in the 10 kilometre classical race.

Distance
Men

Athlete	Event	Time	Rank
Lars Flora	15 km classical	41:53.1	50
Justin Freeman	15 km classical	42:00.9	52
Kris Freeman	15 km classical	39:57.4	21
Andrew Johnson	15 km classical	41:53.9	51
Lars Flora	30 km pursuit	1:22:31.2	49
Andrew Johnson	30 km pursuit	1:21:16.8	43
James Southam	30 km pursuit	1:22:05.8	44
Carl Swenson	30 km pursuit	1:21.08.0	40
Kris Freeman	50 km freestyle	2:15:32.6	61
Andrew Johnson	50 km freestyle	2:07:56.3	34
James Southam	50 km freestyle	DNF	
Carl Swenson	50 km freestyle	DNF	
Lars Flora; Kris Freeman; Andrew Johnson; Carl Swenson	4 x 10 km relay	1:48:44.2	12

Women

Athlete	Event	Time	Rank
Abby Larson	10 km classical	32:09.0	57
Kikkan Randall	10 km classical	31:49.7	53
Wendy Kay Wagner	10 km classical	31:41.0	50
Lindsey Weier	10 km classical	32:43.3	59
Rebecca Dussault	15 km pursuit	47:53.7	48
Abby Larson	15 km pursuit	48:47.5	56
Lindsey Weier	15 km pursuit	48:45.0	55
Lindsay Williams	15 km pursuit	50:49.7	62
Rebecca Dussault	30 km freestyle	1:31:43.3	43
Sarah Konrad	30 km freestyle	1:28:39.2	32
Abby Larson	30 km freestyle	1:32:51.9	47
Lindsey Weier	30 km freestyle	DNF	
Wendy Kay Wagner; Kikkan Randall; Sarah Konrad; Rebecca Dussault	4 x 5 km relay	57:58.4	14

Sprint
Men

Athlete	Event	Qualifying		Quarterfinal		Semifinal		Final	
Athlete	Event	Time	Rank	Time	Rank	Time	Rank	Time	Rank
Chris Cook	Sprint	2:18.46	16 Q	2:27.9	5	Did not advance			
Lars Flora	Sprint	2:23.02	46	Did not advance					
Torin Koos	Sprint	2:21.47	36	Did not advance					
Andrew Newell	Sprint	2:14.79	2 Q	2:24.3	4	Did not advance			
Chris Cook; Andrew Newell	Team sprint	—N/a				17:54.9	7	Did not advance	13

Women

Athlete	Event	Qualifying		Quarterfinal		Semifinal		Final	
Athlete	Event	Time	Rank	Time	Rank	Time	Rank	Time	Rank
Kikkan Randall	Sprint	2:15.63	10 Q	2:17.8	2 Q	2:19.1	5	Did not advance	
Wendy Kay Wagner	Sprint	2:19.71	35	Did not advance					
Lindsay Williams	Sprint	2:20.28	38	Did not advance					
Kikkan Randall; Wendy Kay Wagner	Team sprint	—N/a				17:51.4	5 Q	18:04.9	10

== Curling ==
In the men's event, Pete Fenson, who led his team to 4th place at the a 2006 World Championships, started inconsistently, with a 2–2 record that included a win over the defending gold medalists from Norway. A stretch of four straight wins, however, guaranteed them a spot in the medal round going into a final round-robin game with Canada. The Americans lost that game, meaning they would face Canada again in the semifinals. They also lost this second meeting, but recovered to win the United States' first ever curling medal by beating Great Britain 8–6 in the bronze medal game.

On the women's side, Cassandra Johnson, the 2005 World Championship silver medalist, struggled winning only two games and finishing well short of the mark needed to make the medal round.

Summary

Team	Event	Group stage										Semifinal	Final / BM	
Team	Event	Opposition Score	Opposition Score	Opposition Score	Opposition Score	Opposition Score	Opposition Score	Opposition Score	Opposition Score	Opposition Score	Rank	Opposition Score	Opposition Score	Rank
Scott Baird; Pete Fenson (S); Joseph Polo; Shawn Rojeski; John Shuster	Men's tournament	NOR; W 11–5	FIN; L 3–4	NZL; W 10–4	ITA; L 5–6	SWE; W 10–6	SUI; W 7–3	GER; W 8–5	GBR; W 9–8	CAN; L 3–6	3 Q	CAN; L 5–11	GBR; W 8–6	3rd place, bronze medalist(s)
Maureen Brunt; Courtney George; Cassandra Johnson (S); Jamie Johnson; Jessica Schultz	Women's tournament	NOR; L 6–11	CAN; L 5–11	JPN; L 5–6	DEN; W 8–3	SWE; L 4–5	RUS; L 7–8	ITA; W 11–3	SUI; L 8–9	GBR; L 4–10	8	Did not advance		

=== Men's tournament ===
Team

Position	Curler
Skip	Pete Fenson
Third	Shawn Rojeski
Second	Joe Polo
Lead	John Schuster
Alternate	Scott Baird

Round-robin

Nation	Skip	W	L	PF	PA	Ends won	Ends lost	Blank ends	Stolen ends	Shot pct.
Finland	Markku Uusipaavalniemi	7	2	53	40	32	31	23	9	78%
Canada	Brad Gushue	6	3	66	46	47	31	9	23	80%
United States	Pete Fenson	6	3	66	47	36	33	16	13	80%
Great Britain	David Murdoch	6	3	59	49	36	31	17	12	81%
Norway	Pål Trulsen	5	4	57	47	33	32	17	9	78%
Switzerland	Ralph Stöckli	5	4	56	45	31	34	18	10	76%
Italy	Joël Retornaz	4	5	47	66	37	38	10	7	70%
Germany	Andy Kapp	3	6	53	55	34	34	17	12	77%
Sweden	Peja Lindholm	3	6	45	68	31	40	12	4	78%
New Zealand	Sean Becker	0	9	37	76	28	41	12	6	69%

Rank	Team	Skip	Won	Lost
1	Finland	Markku Uusipaavalniemi	7	2
2	Canada	Brad Gushue	6	3
3	United States	Pete Fenson	6	3
4	Great Britain	David Murdoch	6	3
5	Norway	Pål Trulsen	5	4
6	Switzerland	Ralph Stöckli	5	4
7	Italy	Joel Retornaz	4	5
8	Sweden	Peter Lindholm	3	6
9	Germany	Andy Kapp	3	6
10	New Zealand	Sean Becker	0	9

Draw 1
Monday, February 13, 9:00

Team	1	2	3	4	5	6	7	8	9	10	Final
Norway (Trulsen)	1	0	0	2	0	2	0	0	X	X	5
United States (Fenson) 🔨	0	2	1	0	3	0	0	5	X	X	11

Draw 3
Tuesday, February 14, 14:00

Team	1	2	3	4	5	6	7	8	9	10	Final
United States (Fenson)	0	2	2	0	2	1	0	3	X	X	10
New Zealand (Becker) 🔨	2	0	0	0	0	0	2	0	X	X	4

Draw 6
Thursday, February 16, 14:00

Team	1	2	3	4	5	6	7	8	9	10	Final
United States (Fenson)	0	2	0	2	0	1	0	1	2	2	10
Sweden (Lindholm) 🔨	2	0	2	0	1	0	1	0	0	0	6

Draw 9
Saturday, February 18, 14:00

Team	1	2	3	4	5	6	7	8	9	10	Final
Germany (Kapp)	0	0	1	0	1	0	2	0	1	X	5
United States (Fenson) 🔨	2	1	0	0	0	2	0	3	0	0	8

Draw 12
Monday, February 20, 14:00

Team	1	2	3	4	5	6	7	8	9	10	Final
Canada (Gushue) 🔨	0	0	0	2	0	0	0	2	1	1	6
United States (Fenson)	1	0	0	0	1	0	1	0	0	0	3

Draw 2
Monday, February 13, 19:00

Team	1	2	3	4	5	6	7	8	9	10	Final
Finland (Uusipaavalniemi)	0	0	0	2	0	0	0	1	0	1	4
United States (Fenson) 🔨	0	2	0	0	0	1	0	0	0	0	3

Draw 5
Wednesday, February 15, 19:00

Team	1	2	3	4	5	6	7	8	9	10	Final
United States (Fenson)	0	0	0	0	2	0	2	0	0	1	5
Italy (Retornaz) 🔨	0	0	1	1	0	2	0	1	1	0	6

Draw 8
Friday, February 17, 19:00

Team	1	2	3	4	5	6	7	8	9	10	Final
United States (Fenson) 🔨	0	0	2	0	0	1	1	0	2	1	7
Switzerland (Stöckli)	0	0	0	0	1	0	0	2	0	0	3

Draw 10
Sunday, February 19, 9:00

Team	1	2	3	4	5	6	7	8	9	10	Final
Great Britain (Murdoch)	0	1	0	2	1	0	0	1	2	1	8
United States (Fenson) 🔨	2	0	4	0	0	1	2	0	0	0	9

Semifinal
Wednesday, February 22, 19:00

Team	1	2	3	4	5	6	7	8	9	10	Final
Canada (Gushue) 🔨	0	2	0	2	0	2	0	0	5	X	11
United States (Fenson)	1	0	1	0	1	0	0	2	0	X	5

Bronze medal game
Friday, February 24, 13:00

Team	1	2	3	4	5	6	7	8	9	10	Final
United States (Fenson) 🔨	1	0	3	0	0	2	0	1	0	1	8
Great Britain (Murdoch)	0	1	0	1	0	0	3	0	1	0	6

=== Women's tournament ===
Team

Position	Curler
Skip	Cassandra Johnson
Third	Jamie Johnson
Second	Jessica Schultz
Lead	Maureen Brunt
Alternate	Courtney George

Round-robin

Rank	Team	Skip	Won	Lost
1	Sweden	Anette Norberg	7	2
2	Switzerland	Mirjam Ott	7	2
3	Canada	Shannon Kleibrink	6	3
4	Norway	Dordi Nordby	6	3
5	Great Britain	Rhona Martin	5	4
6	Russia	Ludmila Privivkova	5	4
7	Japan	Ayumi Onodera	4	5
8	Denmark	Dorthe Holm	2	7
9	United States	Cassandra Johnson	2	7
10	Italy	Diana Gaspari	1	8

Draw 1
Monday, February 13, 14:00

Team	1	2	3	4	5	6	7	8	9	10	Final
Norway (Nordby)	0	1	0	0	3	0	3	2	1	1	11
United States (Johnson) 🔨	2	0	1	1	0	2	0	0	0	0	6

Draw 3
Tuesday, February 14, 19:00

Team	1	2	3	4	5	6	7	8	9	10	11	Final
United States (Johnson) 🔨	2	0	0	0	1	0	1	0	1	0	0	5
Japan (Onodera)	0	0	2	1	0	0	0	2	0	0	1	6

Draw 6
Thursday, February 16, 19:00

Team	1	2	3	4	5	6	7	8	9	10	11	Final
Sweden (Norberg) 🔨	0	1	0	0	0	0	1	1	0	1	1	5
United States (Johnson)	0	0	1	0	1	0	0	0	2	0	0	4

Draw 9
Saturday, February 18, 19:00

Team	1	2	3	4	5	6	7	8	9	10	Final
Italy (Gaspari)	0	0	0	0	3	0	X	X	X	X	3
United States (Johnson) 🔨	0	2	3	2	0	4	X	X	X	X	11

Draw 12
Monday, February 20, 19:00

Team	1	2	3	4	5	6	7	8	9	10	Final
United States (Johnson)	0	1	0	3	0	0	X	X	X	X	4
Great Britain (Martin) 🔨	2	0	4	0	3	1	X	X	X	X	10

Draw 2
Tuesday, February 14, 9:00

Team	1	2	3	4	5	6	7	8	9	10	Final
United States (Johnson)	0	0	1	0	2	0	2	0	X	X	5
Canada (Kleibrink) 🔨	5	1	0	1	0	3	0	1	X	X	11

Draw 4
Wednesday, February 15, 14:00

Team	1	2	3	4	5	6	7	8	9	10	Final
Denmark (Holm)	0	0	1	0	0	2	0	0	0	0	3
United States (Johnson) 🔨	0	1	0	1	2	0	0	1	1	2	8

Draw 7
Friday, February 17, 14:00

Team	1	2	3	4	5	6	7	8	9	10	11	Final
United States (Johnson)	0	0	2	0	0	0	2	0	0	3	0	7
Russia (Privivkova) 🔨	0	2	0	1	1	2	0	1	0	0	1	8

Draw 10
Sunday, February 19, 14:00

Team	1	2	3	4	5	6	7	8	9	10	Final
Switzerland (Ott)	0	2	2	0	0	1	0	1	0	3	9
United States (Johnson) 🔨	2	0	0	1	2	0	2	0	1	0	8

Key: The hammer indicates which team had the last stone in the first end.

== Figure skating ==
The American figure skating team won two medals in Turin, both silver. Sasha Cohen led the ladies' singles event after the short program, but an early fall in the free skate left her in second place. In the ice dance, the team of Tanith Belbin and Benjamin Agosto sat just sixth after the compulsory dance, but moved up the standings in the original dance, claiming the second silver medal. Michelle Kwan, an Olympic medalist in Nagano and Salt Lake, planned to compete in Turin, but pulled out due to a severe groin strain. Emily Hughes competed in place of Kwan.

Individual

Athlete	Event	SP		FS		Total	
Athlete	Event	Points	Rank	Points	Rank	Points	Rank
Evan Lysacek	Men's	67.55	10 Q	152.58	3	220.13	4
Matthew Savoie	Men's	69.15	8 Q	137.52	5	206.67	7
Johnny Weir	Men's	80.00	2 Q	136.63	6	216.63	5
Sasha Cohen	Ladies'	66.73	1 Q	116.63	2	183.36	2nd place, silver medalist(s)
Emily Hughes	Ladies'	57.08	7 Q	103.79	7	160.87	7
Kimmie Meissner	Ladies'	59.40	5 Q	106.31	6	165.71	6

Mixed

Athlete	Event	CD		SP/OD		FS/FD		Total	
Athlete	Event	Points	Rank	Points	Rank	Points	Rank	Points	Rank
Rena Inoue; John Baldwin Jr.	Pairs	—N/a		61.27	4	113.74	7	175.01	7
Marcy Hinzmann; Aaron Parchem	Pairs	—N/a		49.58	13	97.47	13	147.05	13
Tanith Belbin; Benjamin Agosto	Ice dance	37.36	6	60.53	2	98.17	4	196.06	2nd place, silver medalist(s)
Melissa Gregory; Denis Petukhov	Ice dance	30.51	15	47.00	14	81.64	14	159.15	14
Jamie Silverstein; Ryan O'Meara	Ice dance	27.53	18	46.00	16	76.87	18	150.40	16

== Freestyle skiing ==
The American freestyle skiing team in Turin boasted several medalists from previous Olympics, including 1998 aerials gold medalist Eric Bergoust. Two other skiers had won gold medals at the World Championships, Jeremy Bloom and Hannah Kearney. Despite this strong roster, the U.S. team won just a single medal in Turin, as Toby Dawson rose from 6th place in qualification to take bronze in the men's moguls. Kearney's failure to even advance from the qualifiers in the women's moguls was considering one of the team's disappointing performances.

Men

Athlete	Event	Qualifying						Final					
Athlete	Event	Jump 1		Jump 2		Total		Jump 1		Jump 2		Total	
Athlete	Event	Points	Rank	Points	Rank	Points	Rank	Points	Rank	Points	Rank	Points	Rank
Eric Bergoust	Aerials	113.72	14	92.13	20	205.85	17	Did not advance					
Joe Pack	Aerials	97.57	20	113.76	8	211.33	15	Did not advance					
Jeret Peterson	Aerials	114.38	11	112.83	9	227.21	8 Q	124.78	3	112.70	8	237.48	7
Ryan St. Onge	Aerials	97.35	21	110.40	11	207.75	16	Did not advance					
Jeremy Bloom	Moguls	—N/a				24.51	4 Q	—N/a				25.17	6
Travis Cabral	Moguls	—N/a				24.88	2 Q	—N/a				24.38	9
Toby Dawson	Moguls	—N/a				24.20	6 Q	—N/a				26.30	3rd place, bronze medalist(s)
Travis Mayer	Moguls	—N/a				24.04	7 Q	—N/a				24.91	7

Women

Athlete	Event	Qualifying						Final					
Athlete	Event	Jump 1		Jump 2		Total		Jump 1		Jump 2		Total	
Athlete	Event	Points	Rank	Points	Rank	Points	Rank	Points	Rank	Points	Rank	Points	Rank
Emily Cook	Aerials	60.32	22	84.10	7	144.42	19	Did not advance					
Jana Lindsey	Aerials	79.38	15	70.85	18	150.23	16	Did not advance					
Shannon Bahrke	Moguls	—N/a				22.07	18 Q	—N/a				22.82	10
Hannah Kearney	Moguls	—N/a				20.80	22	—N/a				Did not advance	
Michelle Roark	Moguls	—N/a				24.45	4 Q	—N/a				20.04	18
Jillian Vogtli	Moguls	—N/a				21.79	20 Q	—N/a				22.72	11

== Ice hockey ==
The U.S. men's team, which won a silver medal on home ice in Salt Lake City, had a poor start when they suffered a surprising 3–3 tie against Latvia. They did rebound with a win over Kazakhstan, but further losses to Slovakia, Sweden and Russia meant that the Americans finished fourth in their group, with the lowest point total of any team advancing to the medal round. In their quarterfinal against undefeated Finland, the Americans quickly fell behind 2–0, but managed to tie the game early in the second period. However, the Finns again took a two-goal lead later in the second, and while the Americans managed to score once more, they could not get closer than a 4–3 loss.

The women's team, also defending silver medalists, had a very strong round-robin showing, winning their three games by a combined score of 18–3. In the semifinals, the U.S. team played Sweden, with the Americans taking a 2–0 lead early in the second period. However, the Swedes then rallied, scoring twice to tie the game, and holding off the American attack and forcing a shootout to decide the game. Swedish goaltender Kim Martin stopped four American shooters, while Pernilla Winberg and Maria Rooth scored for Sweden. The American women bounced back from this loss in the bronze medal game, beating Finland 4–0.

Summary

Team	Event	Group stage						Quarterfinal	Semifinal	Final / BM	
Team	Event	Opposition Score	Opposition Score	Opposition Score	Opposition Score	Opposition Score	Rank	Opposition Score	Opposition Score	Opposition Score	Rank
United States men's	Men's tournament	Latvia; T 3–3	Kazakhstan; W 4–1	Slovenia; L 1–2	Sweden; L 1–2	Russia; L 4–5	4 Q	Finland; L 3–4	Did not advance		
United States women's	Women's tournament	Switzerland; W 6–0	Germany; W 5–0	Finland; W 7–3	—N/a		1 Q	—N/a	Sweden; L 2–3 GWS	Finland; W 4–0	3rd place, bronze medalist(s)

=== Men's tournament ===
Roster The following is the American roster for the men's ice hockey tournament at the 2006 Winter Olympics.

Head coach: Peter Laviolette

Assistant Coaches: Keith Allain, Mike Sullivan

No.	Pos.	Name	Height	Weight	Birthdate	Birthplace	2005–06 team
29	G	Rick DiPietro	180 cm (5 ft 11 in)	84 kg (185 lb)	19 September 1981	Winthrop, MA	New York Islanders (NHL)
42	G	Robert Esche	185 cm (6 ft 1 in)	95 kg (209 lb)	22 January 1978	Utica, NY	Philadelphia Flyers (NHL)
47	G	John Grahame	188 cm (6 ft 2 in)	95 kg (209 lb)	31 August 1975	Denver, CO	Tampa Bay Lightning (NHL)
24	D	Chris Chelios – C	185 cm (6 ft 1 in)	86 kg (190 lb)	25 January 1962	Chicago, IL	Detroit Red Wings (NHL)
2	D	Derian Hatcher	196 cm (6 ft 5 in)	107 kg (236 lb)	4 June 1972	Sterling Heights, MI	Philadelphia Flyers (NHL)
4	D	Jordan Leopold	185 cm (6 ft 1 in)	93 kg (205 lb)	3 August 1980	Golden Valley, MN	Calgary Flames (NHL)
27	D	John-Michael Liles	178 cm (5 ft 10 in)	84 kg (185 lb)	25 November 1980	Zionsville, IN	Colorado Avalanche (NHL)
6	D	Bret Hedican	188 cm (6 ft 2 in)	93 kg (205 lb)	10 August 1970	St. Paul, MN	Carolina Hurricanes (NHL)
28	D	Brian Rafalski	175 cm (5 ft 9 in)	86 kg (190 lb)	28 September 1973	Dearborn, MI	New Jersey Devils (NHL)
23	D	Mathieu Schneider	180 cm (5 ft 11 in)	85 kg (187 lb)	12 June 1969	New York, NY	Detroit Red Wings (NHL)
55	F	Jason Blake	178 cm (5 ft 10 in)	82 kg (181 lb)	2 September 1973	Moorhead, MN	New York Islanders (NHL)
26	F	Erik Cole	188 cm (6 ft 2 in)	91 kg (201 lb)	6 November 1978	Oswego, NY	Carolina Hurricanes (NHL)
22	F	Craig Conroy	188 cm (6 ft 2 in)	91 kg (201 lb)	4 September 1971	Potsdam, NY	Los Angeles Kings (NHL)
18	F	Chris Drury	178 cm (5 ft 10 in)	82 kg (181 lb)	20 August 1976	Trumbull, CT	Buffalo Sabres (NHL)
14	F	Brian Gionta	170 cm (5 ft 7 in)	79 kg (174 lb)	18 January 1979	Rochester, NY	New Jersey Devils (NHL)
11	F	Scott Gomez	180 cm (5 ft 11 in)	91 kg (201 lb)	23 December 1979	Anchorage, AK	New Jersey Devils (NHL)
13	F	Bill Guerin	188 cm (6 ft 2 in)	95 kg (209 lb)	9 November 1970	Wilbraham, MA	Dallas Stars (NHL)
21	F	Mike Knuble	191 cm (6 ft 3 in)	103 kg (227 lb)	4 July 1972	Toronto, Ontario, Canada	Philadelphia Flyers (NHL)
9	F	Mike Modano	191 cm (6 ft 3 in)	93 kg (205 lb)	7 June 1970	Livonia, MI	Dallas Stars (NHL)
37	F	Mark Parrish	183 cm (6 ft 0 in)	91 kg (201 lb)	2 February 1977	Minneapolis, MN	New York Islanders (NHL)
12	F	Brian Rolston	188 cm (6 ft 2 in)	95 kg (209 lb)	21 February 1973	Flint, MI	Minnesota Wild (NHL)
7	F	Keith Tkachuk	188 cm (6 ft 2 in)	102 kg (225 lb)	28 March 1972	Melrose, MA	St. Louis Blues (NHL)
39	F	Doug Weight	180 cm (5 ft 11 in)	91 kg (201 lb)	21 January 1971	Warren, MI	St. Louis Blues (NHL)

Group play

Pos	Team	Pld	W	D	L	GF	GA	GD	Pts	Qualification
1	Slovakia	5	5	0	0	18	8	+10	10	Quarterfinals
2	Russia	5	4	0	1	23	11	+12	8	Quarterfinals
3	Sweden	5	3	0	2	15	12	+3	6	Quarterfinals
4	United States	5	1	1	3	13	13	0	3	Quarterfinals
5	Kazakhstan	5	1	0	4	9	16	−7	2	
6	Latvia	5	0	1	4	11	29	−18	1	

Source: IIHF

15 February 2006; 21:05	Latvia	3–3 (1–2, 2–0, 0–1)	United States	Palasport Olimpico, Turin; Attendance: 7,851

Game reference

Artūrs Irbe
Goalies
John Grahame
Referee:
(Finland) Timo Favorin
Linesmen:
(Germany) Thomas Gemeinhardt
(Canada) Steve Miller

	0–1	9:44 – B. Gionta (J. Liles, S. Gomez) (PP)
	0–2	10:38 – C. Conroy
A. Ņiživijs (S. Ozoliņš) – 13:15	1–2
A. Tribuncovs (S. Ozoliņš, A. Ņiživijs) (PP) – 35:04	2–2
H. Vasiļjevs (R. Laviņš) – 35:44	3–2
	3–3	42:01 – J. Leopold (B. Hedican, C. Conroy)

16 min
Penalties
16 min
25
Shots
42

16 February 2006; 21:05	United States	4–1 (3–0, 0–0, 1–1)	Kazakhstan	Torino Esposizioni, Turin; Attendance: 3,400

Game reference

Rick DiPietro
Goalies
Vitali Kolesnik
Referee:
(Sweden) Thomas Andersson
Linesmen:
(Canada) Derek Doucette
(Finland) Antti Hämäläinen

B. Guerin (C. Drury) – 1:34	1–0
B. Rolston (D. Weight) (PP) – 8:31	2–0
B. Gionta (J. Liles, S. Gomez) (PP) – 16:50	3–0
	3–1	51:02 – E. Koreshkov (A. Vassilchenko) (PP)
M. Modano (E. Cole) – 51:53	4–1

10 min
Penalties
20 min
36
Shots
12

18 February 2006; 20:05	Slovakia	2–1 (0–0, 1–1, 1–0)	United States	Torino Esposizioni, Turin; Attendance: 4,697

Game reference

Peter Budaj
Goalies
Rick DiPietro
Referee:
(Canada) Dan Marouelli
Linesmen:
(Czech Republic) Petr Blümel
(Canada) Pierre Racicot

Mari. Hossa (P. Demitra, M. Gáborík) (PP) – 34:20	1–0
	1–1	38:24 – B. Rolston (B. Rafalski, S. Gomez) (PP)
P. Bondra (M. Šatan, R. Kapuš) – 41:48	2–1

8 min
Penalties
16 min
21
Shots
30

19 February 2006; 17:05	United States	1–2 (1–1, 0–0, 0–1)	Sweden	Torino Esposizioni, Turin; Attendance: 4,450

Game reference

Rick DiPietro
Goalies
Henrik Lundqvist
Referee:
(Canada) Dan Marouelli
Linesmen:
(Germany) Thomas Gemeinhardt
(Canada) Steve Miller

	0–1	7:05 – D. Alfredsson (K. Jönsson, M. Sundin)
M. Modano (C. Conroy, C. Chelios) – 17:31	1–1
	1–2	44:22 – M. Samuelsson (D. Alfredsson, M. Sundin) (PP)

14 min
Penalties
12 min
25
Shots
26

21 February 2006; 20:35	United States	4–5 (1–2, 1–1, 2–2)	Russia	Palasport Olimpico, Turin; Attendance: 9,378

Game reference

Robert Esche
Goalies
Evgeni Nabokov (out 20:00)
Maxim Sokolov (in 20:00)
Referee:
(Canada) Paul Devorski
Linesmen:
(Finland) Stefan Fonselius
(Canada) Steve Miller

	0–1	9:27 – A. Korolyuk
	0–2	10:41 – E. Malkin (D. Kasparaitis) (SH)
B. Rolston (C. Conroy) (PP) – 18:38	1–2
	1–3	35:00 – A. Markov (P. Datsyuk, M. Sushinsky)
B. Gionta (S. Gomez, D. Weight) (PP) – 39:01	2–3
S. Gomez (M. Schneider, B. Rolston) (PP) – 45:00	3–3
	3–4	49:55 – A. Ovechkin (E. Malkin, D. Kasparaitis)
E. Cole (M. Knuble, C. Drury) – 50:38	4–4
	4–5	51:52 – A. Kovalev (P. Datsyuk, E. Malkin)

8 min
Penalties
14 min
34
Shots
21

Quarterfinal

22 February 2006; 17:35	Finland	4–3 (2–1, 2–1, 0–1)	United States	Palasport Olimpico, Turin; Attendance: 6,691

Game reference

Antero Niittymäki
Goalies
Rick DiPietro
Referee:
(Canada) Paul Devorski
Linesmen:
(Slovakia) Milan Mášik
(Canada) Steve Miller

V. Peltonen (J. Jokinen, S. Salo) – 9:33	1–0
S. Salo (SH) − 12:01	2–0
	2–1	13:14 – M. Knuble (M. Schneider, D. Weight)
	2–2	21:29 − M. Schneider (B. Rafalski, C. Conroy) (PP)
O. Jokinen (V. Peltonen) (PP) – 25:06	3–2
O. Jokinen (PP2) – 37:10	4–2
	4–3	55:33 – B. Gionta (C. Drury, E. Cole)

16 min
Penalties
30 min
25
Shots
28

The Roster for Men’s ice hockey is missing Bret Hedican, Defenseman

=== Women's tournament ===
Roster

No.	Pos.	Name	Height	Weight	Birthdate	Birthplace	2004–05 team
8	D	Caitlin Cahow	162 cm (5 ft 4 in)	70 kg (150 lb)	20 May 1985 (aged 20)	New Haven, Connecticut	Harvard Crimson women's ice hockey
13	F	Julie Chu	173 cm (5 ft 8 in)	68 kg (150 lb)	13 March 1982 (aged 23)	Fairfield, Connecticut	Harvard Crimson women's ice hockey
22	F	Natalie Darwitz	160 cm (5 ft 3 in)	64 kg (141 lb)	13 October 1983 (aged 22)	Eagan, Minnesota	Minnesota Golden Gophers women's ice hockey
31	G	Pam Dreyer	165 cm (5 ft 5 in)	70 kg (150 lb)	9 August 1981 (aged 24)	Eagle River, Alaska	Brown Bears women's ice hockey
25	F	Tricia Dunn-Luoma	173 cm (5 ft 8 in)	66 kg (146 lb)	25 April 1975 (aged 30)	Derry, New Hampshire	New Hampshire Wildcats women's ice hockey
9	D	Molly Engstrom	175 cm (5 ft 9 in)	77 kg (170 lb)	1 March 1983 (aged 22)	Siren, Wisconsin	Wisconsin Badgers women's ice hockey
30	G	Chanda Gunn	170 cm (5 ft 7 in)	63 kg (139 lb)	27 January 1980 (aged 26)	Huntington Beach, California	Northeastern Huskies women's ice hockey
11	D	Jamie Hagerman	175 cm (5 ft 9 in)	77 kg (170 lb)	7 May 1981 (aged 24)	North Andover, Massachusetts	Harvard Crimson women's ice hockey
10	F	Kim Insalaco	165 cm (5 ft 5 in)	59 kg (130 lb)	4 November 1980 (aged 25)	Rochester, New York	Brown Bears women's ice hockey
18	F	Kathleen Kauth	173 cm (5 ft 8 in)	68 kg (150 lb)	28 March 1979 (aged 26)	Saratoga Springs, New York	Brown Bears women's ice hockey
3	D	Courtney Kennedy	175 cm (5 ft 9 in)	86 kg (190 lb)	29 March 1979 (aged 26)	Woburn, Massachusetts	Minnesota Golden Gophers women's ice hockey
20	F	Katie King	175 cm (5 ft 9 in)	77 kg (170 lb)	24 May 1975 (aged 30)	Salem, New Hampshire	Brown Bears women's ice hockey
19	F	Kristin King	163 cm (5 ft 4 in)	61 kg (134 lb)	21 July 1979 (aged 26)	Piqua, Ohio	Dartmouth Big Green women's ice hockey
27	F	Sarah Parsons	173 cm (5 ft 8 in)	64 kg (141 lb)	27 July 1987 (aged 18)	Dover, Massachusetts	Noble & Greenough High School
12	F	Jenny Potter	163 cm (5 ft 4 in)	66 kg (146 lb)	12 January 1979 (aged 27)	Edina, Minnesota	Minnesota Duluth Bulldogs women's ice hockey
6	D	Helen Resor	178 cm (5 ft 10 in)	70 kg (150 lb)	18 October 1985 (aged 20)	Greenwich, Connecticut	Yale Bulldogs women's ice hockey
4	D	Angela Ruggiero – A	175 cm (5 ft 9 in)	84 kg (185 lb)	3 January 1980 (aged 26)	Harper Woods, Michigan	Harvard Crimson women's ice hockey
14	F	Kelly Stephens	168 cm (5 ft 6 in)	59 kg (130 lb)	4 June 1983 (aged 22)	Seattle, Washington	Minnesota Golden Gophers women's ice hockey
5	D	Lyndsay Wall	173 cm (5 ft 8 in)	70 kg (150 lb)	12 May 1985 (aged 20)	Churchville, New York	Minnesota Golden Gophers women's ice hockey
7	F	Krissy Wendell – C	168 cm (5 ft 6 in)	70 kg (150 lb)	12 September 1981 (aged 24)	Brooklyn Park, Minnesota	Minnesota Golden Gophers women's ice hockey

Group play

Pos	Team	Pld	W	D	L	GF	GA	GD	Pts	Qualification
1	United States	3	3	0	0	18	3	+15	6	Semifinals
2	Finland	3	2	0	1	10	7	+3	4	Semifinals
3	Germany	3	1	0	2	2	9	−7	2	5–8th place semifinals
4	Switzerland	3	0	0	3	1	12	−11	0	5–8th place semifinals

11 February 2006; 18:05	United States	6–0 (1–0, 1–0, 4–0)	Switzerland	Torino Esposizioni, Turin; Attendance: 2,900

Game reference

Chanda Gunn
Goalies
Patricia Elsmore-Sautter
Referee:
(Czech Republic) Kateřina Ivičičová
Linesmen:
(Russia) Marina Konstantinova
(Canada) Kim Robichaud

Ka. King (Potter) – 02:38	1–0
Dunn-Luoma (SH2) – 32:27	2–0
Wendell (Ruggiero, Potter) – 47:53	3–0
Darwitz (Parsons) – 50:33	4–0
Wendell (Potter) – 52:40	5–0
Potter (Ruggiero) (PP) – 58:50	6–0

18 min
Penalties
14 min
56
Shots
9

12 February 2006; 19:05	Germany	0–5 (0–2, 0–2, 0–1)	United States	Palasport Olimpico, Turin; Attendance: 7,794

Game reference

Jennifer Harß
Goalies
Pam Dreyer
Referee:
(Finland) Anu Hirvonen
Linesmen:
(Sweden) Annica Flödén
(Norway) Marte Hove

0–1	04:33 – Potter (Ka. King) (PP)
0–2	17:13 – Ka. King (Chu, Potter) (PP)
0–3	21:11 – Parsons (Resor, Stephens)
0–4	29:57 – Darwitz (Parsons, Ka. King)
0–5	50:54 – Parsons (Ruggiero)

20 min
Penalties
16 min
10
Shots
60

14 February 2006; 20:35	United States	7–3 (1–2, 1–1, 5–0)	Finland	Palasport Olimpico, Turin; Attendance: 7,697

Game reference

Chanda Gunn
Goalies
Maija Hassinen
Referee:
(Canada) Stephanie Normand
Linesmen:
(Czech Republic) Klára Quagliato
(Canada) Kim Robichaud

	0–1	00:13 – Pehkonen (Rantamäki)
Parsons (Wendell, Potter) (PP) – 08:08	1–1
	1–2	11:26 – Laaksonen (Tuominen) (PP)
	1–3	32:01 – Kovalainen (Saarinen) (PP2)
Parsons (Chu) – 38:54	2–3
Ka. King – 41:28	3–3
Ruggiero – 50:16	4–3
Darwitz (Wall) (PP) – 51:01	5–3
Wendell (Parsons, Ruggiero) – 52:18	6–3
Ruggiero (Darwitz, Stephens) – 55:36	7–3

38 min
Penalties
22 min
31
Shots
15

Semifinal

17 February 2006; 17:05	United States	2–3 GWS (1–0, 1–2, 0–0) (OT: 0–0) (SO: 0–1)	Sweden	Palasport Olimpico, Turin; Attendance: 5,654

Game reference

Chanda Gunn
Goalies
Kim Martin
Referee:
(United Kingdom) Joy Tottman
Linesmen:
(Finland) Sanna Mattila
(Finland) Johanna Suban

Kr. King (Potter, Chu) (PP) – 11:55	1–0
Stephens (Wall, Darwitz) (PP) – 21:04	2–0
	2–1	26:17 – Rooth (O'Konor)
	2–2	29:40 – Rooth (Holst) (SH)

Darwitz (miss)
Potter (miss)
Ruggiero (miss)
Wendell (miss)
Shootout
(miss) Holst
(miss) Jansson
Winberg
Rooth
12 min
Penalties
22 min
39
Shots
18

Bronze medal game

20 February 2006; 16:35	Finland	0–4 (0–3, 0–1, 0–0)	United States (bronze)	Palasport Olimpico, Turin; Attendance: 5,150

Game reference

Noora Räty
Maija Hassinen
Goalies
Chanda Gunn
Referee:
(United Kingdom) Joy Tottman
Linesmen:
(Germany) Michaela Kiefer
(Canada) Kim Robichaud

0–1	02:32 – Stephens (Chu, Darwitz) (PP)
0–2	08:09 – Ka. King (Resor)
0–3	11:06 – Ka. King (Potter)
0–4	21:44 – Ka. King (Chu, Kr. King)

12 min
Penalties
20 min
14
Shots
20

== Luge ==
Tony Benshoof was in position to win America's first singles luge medal after the first two runs, but two slower efforts on the final two runs left him in fourth place. Courtney Zablocki had a similar story in the women's event, with a pair of slow runs dropping her well off the medal pace after being in contention for bronze early.

Men

Athlete	Event	Run 1		Run 2		Run 3		Run 4		Total	
Athlete	Event	Time	Rank	Time	Rank	Time	Rank	Time	Rank	Time	Rank
Tony Benshoof	Singles	51.907	4	51.458	2	51.674	7	51.559	5	3:26.598	4
Jonathan Myles	Singles	52.579	18	52.267	20	52.230	16	52.332	20	3:29.408	18
Christian Niccum	Singles	53.669	29	52.675	26	52.306	19	52.539	25	3:31.189	23
Preston Griffal; Dan Joye	Doubles	47.722	11	47.688	4	—N/a				1:35.410	8
Mark Grimmette; Brian Martin	Doubles	DNF				—N/a				DNF	

Women

Athlete	Event	Run 1		Run 2		Run 3		Run 4		Total	
Athlete	Event	Time	Rank	Time	Rank	Time	Rank	Time	Rank	Time	Rank
Erin Hamlin	Singles	48.660	20	47.816	14	47.534	12	47.280	8	3:11.290	12
Samantha Retrosi	Singles	47.861	13	DNF							
Courtney Zablocki	Singles	47.253	3	47.129	3	47.234	5	47.236	6	3:08.852	4

== Nordic combined ==
Todd Lodwick, who had the United States' best Nordic combined performance in Olympic history in Salt Lake City, finished in the top 10 in both individual events, with his 8th place in the Individual Gundersen the best showing for the U.S. in Turin.

Athlete	Event	Ski jumping		Cross-country		
Athlete	Event	Points	Rank	Deficit	Time	Rank
Eric Camerota	Sprint	94.5	40	2:05	21:04.8	39
Bill Demong	Sprint	102.2	30	1:34	20:03.7	25
Todd Lodwick	Sprint	107.3	19	1:14	19:11.4	9
Johnny Spillane	Sprint	109.5	14	1:05	19:15.2	10
Brett Camerota	Individual Gundersen	203.5	33	3:56	44:59.6	38
Bill Demong	Individual Gundersen	220.0	19	2:50	42:08.5	15
Todd Lodwick	Individual Gundersen	232.0	13	2:02	40:56.6	8
Johnny Spillane	Individual Gundersen	220.0	19	2:50	44:27.6	30
Bill Demong; Todd Lodwick; Johnny Spillane; Carl Van Loan	Team	820.6	8	1:33	51:52.5	7

== Short track speed skating ==
Apolo Anton Ohno became the fourth US Winter Olympian to win three medals in a single games, taking gold in the 500 metres to go with two bronze medals. The only other American to make an 'A-Final' in Turin was Rusty Smith, who set an Olympic record time in the quarterfinals of the 1000 metres, but ended up fourth in the final.

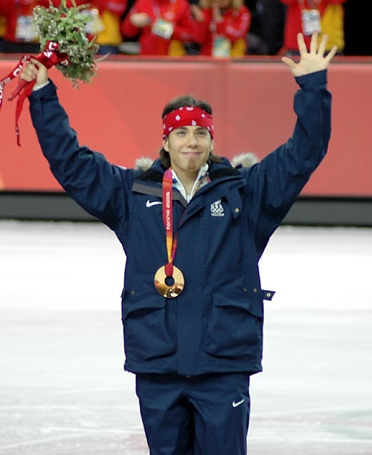
Apolo Ohno won gold in short track (500 m)

Men

Athlete	Event	Heat		Quarterfinal		Semifinal		Final	
Athlete	Event	Time	Rank	Time	Rank	Time	Rank	Time	Rank
Anthony Lobello	500 m	1:13.722	4	Did not advance					
Apolo Ohno	500 m	42.836	1 Q	42.020	1 Q	42.400	2 Q	41.935	1st place, gold medalist(s)
Apolo Ohno	1000 m	1:36.120	1 Q	1:29.650	1 Q	1:28.080	2 Q	1:26.927	3rd place, bronze medalist(s)
Rusty Smith	1000 m	1:27.508	2 Q	1:27.000 OR	1 Q	1:29.515	2 Q	1:27.435	4
Alex Izykowski	1500 m	2:19.731	3 Q	—N/a		2:18.610	5	Did not advance	
Apolo Ohno	1500 m	2:23.668	1 Q	—N/a		2:20.346	4	Final B 2:24.789	8
Alex Izykowski; J. P. Kepka; Apolo Ohno; Rusty Smith	5000 m relay	—N/a				6:55.082	1 Q	6:47.990	3rd place, bronze medalist(s)

Women

Athlete	Event	Heat		Quarterfinal		Semifinal		Final	
Athlete	Event	Time	Rank	Time	Rank	Time	Rank	Time	Rank
Allison Baver	500 m	45.998	1 Q	53.135	2 Q	45.512	3	Final B 55.689	7
Hyo-Jung Kim	500 m	46.077	2 Q	45.339	4	Did not advance			
Kimberly Derrick	1000 m	1:33.812	2 Q	DSQ		Did not advance			
Hyo-Jung Kim	1000 m	1:36.182	1 Q	1:34.164	1 Q	1:54.187	5	Did not advance	
Allison Baver	1500 m	2:27.635	1 Q	—N/a		2:23.490	5	Did not advance	
Hyo-Jung Kim	1500 m	2:27.460	2 Q	—N/a		2:32.527	3	Final B 2:29.978	8
Allison Baver; Kimberly Derrick; Maria Garcia; Caroline Hallisey; Hyo-Jung Kim	3000 m relay	—N/a				4:18.333	5	Final B 4:18.740	4

== Skeleton ==
Zach Lund, considered the U.S.'s primary medal threat in the men's skeleton events, did not compete in the games after testing positive for finasteride (prohibited since 2005). "I've been losing my hair since I was a teenager and I've had a prescription for the last seven years and it was never an issue until this year," Lund told freestyle skiing analyst Nikki Stone (Yahoo! Sports, Feb. 10, 2006). "Whenever I've been tested, I always let them know that I was taking [Propecia]. I never had anything to hide." A panel on the Court of Arbitration for Sport believed Lund and wrote in its ruling that "it was entirely satisfied that Mr. Lund was not a cheat...But, unfortunately, in 2005, he made a mistake." His ban was reduced from two years to one, but this still left in ineligible in Turin.

In the women's events, the U.S. has two medal contenders in Lee Ann Parsley and Noelle Pikus-Pace. However, Parsley's career ended as she attempted to qualify for the 2006 Winter Olympics in Turin. She and several other teammates were struck by a runaway bobsled during a training session in Calgary, Canada on October 19, 2005. The bobsled, which failed to brake after crossing the finish line, ejected out the end of the track and struck Parsley and teammate Noelle Pikus-Pace. Pikus-Pace, who was the reigning overall world cup leader at the time, suffered a compound fracture of her right leg that took her out of the running for a 2006 Olympic bid as well. Parsley suffered soft-tissue injuries to her right leg that severely hampered her ability to compete in the US team trials less than 72 hours after the accident. She stayed with the team however as an assistant coach and was part of the 2006 US Olympic Skeleton Team coaching staff.

In their absence, the best finishes were a pair of 6ths, from Eric Bernotas and Katie Uhlaender in the men's and women's events, respectively.

Athlete	Event	Final			
Athlete	Event	Run 1	Run 2	Total	Rank
Eric Bernotas	Men	58.43	58.76	1:57.19	6
Kevin Ellis	Men	59.46	59.75	1:59.21	17
Chris Soule	Men	1:00.33	1:00.90	2:01.23	25
Katie Uhlaender	Women	1:00.87	1:01.43	2:02.30	6

== Ski jumping ==
No American ski jumper qualified for a final jump in Turin, though Alan Alborn advanced to the first round in both the large and normal hill events.

Athlete	Event	Qualifying		First round		Final		
Athlete	Event	Points	Rank	Points	Rank	Points	Total	Rank
Alan Alborn	Normal hill	117.0	16 Q	106.5	40	Did not advance		40
Jim Denney	Normal hill	91.5	46	Did not advance				46
Clint Jones	Normal hill	104.5	35 Q	97.5	47	Did not advance		47
Tommy Schwall	Normal hill	103.0	38	Did not advance				38
Alan Alborn	Large hill	86.7	21 Q	79.9	43	Did not advance		43
Jim Denney	Large hill	53.5	47	Did not advance				47
Clint Jones	Large hill	64.9	39	Did not advance				39
Tommy Schwall	Large hill	63.4	42	Did not advance				42
Alan Alborn; Anders Johnson; Clint Jones; Tommy Schwall	Large hill team	—N/a		286.8	14	Did not advance		14

== Snowboarding ==
The United States was the dominant nation in the Snowboarding events in Turin. The U.S. won seven medals, easily the most of any country, including three golds, from Shaun White and Hannah Teter in the men's and women's halfpipe and from Seth Wescott in men's snowboard cross. Lindsey Jacobellis was poised to give the Americans a fourth gold medal in the women's snowboard cross, but fell on the final hill while attempting a grab, was passed, and ended up with silver.

Freestyle
Men

Athlete	Event	Qualification				Final		
Athlete	Event	Run 1		Run 2		Final		
Athlete	Event	Points	Rank	Points	Rank	Run 1	Run 2	Rank
Mason Aguirre	Halfpipe	43.4	3 Q	Bye		40.3	37.1	4
Andy Finch	Halfpipe	43.1	4 Q	Bye		9.6	24.7	12
Daniel Kass	Halfpipe	43.8	1 Q	Bye		20.8	44.0	2nd place, silver medalist(s)
Shaun White	Halfpipe	37.7	7	45.3	1 Q	46.8	26.6	1st place, gold medalist(s)

Women

Athlete	Event	Qualification				Final		
Athlete	Event	Run 1		Run 2		Final		
Athlete	Event	Points	Rank	Points	Rank	Run 1	Run 2	Rank
Gretchen Bleiler	Halfpipe	41.6	2 Q	Bye		41.5	43.4	2nd place, silver medalist(s)
Kelly Clark	Halfpipe	44.9	1 Q	Bye		41.1	38.1	4
Elena Hight	Halfpipe	33.1	8	36.8	4 Q	29.4	37.8	6
Hannah Teter	Halfpipe	39.9	3 Q	Bye		44.6	46.4	1st place, gold medalist(s)

Parallel

Athlete	Event	Qualification		Round of 16	Quarterfinals	Semifinals	Finals	
Athlete	Event	Time	Rank	Opposition Time	Opposition Time	Opposition Time	Opposition Time	Rank
Tyler Jewell	Men's parallel giant slalom	1:11.13	9 Q	Kosir (SLO) (8); L +0.30 (-0.29 +0.59)	Did not advance			9
Rosey Fletcher	Women's parallel giant slalom	1:20.88	2 Q	Posch (ITA) (15); W -0.96 (-0.47 -0.49)	Bruhin (SUI) (7); W -0.15 (-0.12 -0.03)	Meuli (SUI) (6); L +3.70 (-0.24 +3.94)	Bronze Final; Guenther (AUT) (8); W -0.69 (-1.50 +0.81)	3rd place, bronze medalist(s)
Michelle Gorgone	Women's parallel giant slalom	1:24.43	22	Did not advance				22

Snowboard cross

Athlete	Event	Qualifying		1/8 finals	Quarterfinals	Semifinals	Finals	
Athlete	Event	Time	Rank	Position	Position	Position	Position	Rank
Nate Holland	Men's snowboard cross	1:21.03	7 Q	1 Q	4	Did not advance	Classification 13-16; 2	14
Jason R. Smith	Men's snowboard cross	1:21.98	15 Q	1Q	1Q	3	Classification 5-8; 2	6
Graham Watanabe	Men's snowboard cross	1:22.98	29 Q	Did not advance				31
Jayson Hale	Men's snowboard cross	N/A	N/A	Injured				N/A
Seth Wescott	Men's snowboard cross	1:20.69	3 Q	1Q	1Q	2 Q	1	1st place, gold medalist(s)
Lindsey Jacobellis	Women's snowboard cross	1:29.51	3 Q	—N/a	2 Q	1 Q	2	2nd place, silver medalist(s)

== Speed skating ==
Three American men combined to win seven medals in Turin. This included three for Chad Hedrick, who entered the Games attempting to equal Eric Heiden's record of five gold medals. Hedrick won his first event, the 5000 metres, but when the men's pursuit team lost to Italy, his chances were dashed. He did not manage a second gold, but did win a silver and a bronze. Hedrick was the source of some controversy when he called out teammate Shani Davis, who skipped the team pursuit in order to prepare for his specialty, the 1000 metres. Davis won this event to become the first ever Winter Olympic individual gold medalist of African descent. The third medalist was Joey Cheek, who won gold in the 500 metres, and was chosen to carry the U.S. flag in the closing ceremonies.

Distance
Men

Athlete	Event	Race 1		Race 2		Total	
Athlete	Event	Time	Rank	Time	Rank	Time	Rank
Kip Carpenter	500 m	36.40	31	35.68	=17	1:12.08	26
Joey Cheek	500 m	34.82	1	34.94	1	1:09.76	1st place, gold medalist(s)
Casey FitzRandolph	500 m	35.78	18	35.34	8	1:11.12	12
Tucker Fredricks	500 m	36.02	25	35.99	28	1:12.01	25
Joey Cheek	1000 m	—N/a				1:09.16	2nd place, silver medalist(s)
Shani Davis	1000 m	—N/a				1:08.89	1st place, gold medalist(s)
Casey FitzRandolph	1000 m	—N/a				1:09.59	9
Chad Hedrick	1000 m	—N/a				1:09.45	6
Joey Cheek	1500 m	—N/a				1:47.52	9
Shani Davis	1500 m	—N/a				1:46.13	2nd place, silver medalist(s)
Chad Hedrick	1500 m	—N/a				1:46.22	3rd place, bronze medalist(s)
Derek Parra	1500 m	—N/a				1:48.54	19
K. C. Boutiette	5000 m	—N/a				6:37.29	19
Shani Davis	5000 m	—N/a				6:23.08	7
Chad Hedrick	5000 m	—N/a				6:14.68	1st place, gold medalist(s)
Chad Hedrick	10000 m	—N/a				13:05.40	2nd place, silver medalist(s)
Charles Leveille	10000 m	—N/a				14:14.81	15

Women

Athlete	Event	Race 1		Race 2		Total	
Athlete	Event	Time	Rank	Time	Rank	Time	Rank
Elli Ochowicz	500 m	39.83	=23	39.86	=22	1:19.48	23
Jennifer Rodriguez	500 m	38.97	10	38.73	10	1:17.70	11
Amy Sannes	500 m	39.42	=15	39.47	20	1:18.89	17
Chris Witty	500 m	40.23	28	40.46	28	1:20.69	28
Elli Ochowicz	1000 m	—N/a				1:19.94	32
Jennifer Rodriguez	1000 m	—N/a				1:17.47	10
Amy Sannes	1000 m	—N/a				1:18.50	25
Chris Witty	1000 m	—N/a				1:18.70	27
Maria Lamb	1500 m	—N/a				2:02.12	27
Catherine Raney	1500 m	—N/a				2:01.17	18
Jennifer Rodriguez	1500 m	—N/a				1:59.30	8
Margaret Crowley	3000 m	—N/a				4:17.37	22
Kristine Holzer	3000 m	—N/a				4:26.60	27
Catherine Raney	3000 m	—N/a				4:10.44	11
Catherine Raney	5000 m	—N/a				7:04.91	7

Team Pursuit

Athlete	Event	Seeding		Quarterfinal	Semifinal	Final	
Athlete	Event	Time	Rank	Opposition Time	Opposition Time	Opposition Time	Rank
K. C. Boutiette; Chad Hedrick; Charles Leveille; Clay Mull; Derek Parra	Men's team pursuit	3:51.32	7	Italy (2); L 3:44.11	Did not advance	Final C Russia (6); L 3:49.73	6
Margaret Crowley; Maria Lamb; Catherine Raney; Jennifer Rodriguez; Amy Sannes	Women's team pursuit	3:07.83	6	Canada (3); L 3:04.59	Did not advance	Final C Netherlands (4); W 3:04.22	5

== See also ==
- United States at the 2006 Winter Paralympics
