= Finland at the 2006 Winter Olympics =

- IOC code: FIN
- NOC: Finnish Olympic Committee
- Website: sport.fi/olympiakomitea (in Finnish and Swedish)

in Turin
- Competitors: 102 in 11 sports
- Flag bearers: Janne Lahtela (opening); Markku Uusipaavalniemi (closing)
- Medals Ranked 19th: Gold 0 Silver 6 Bronze 3 Total 9

Winter Olympics appearances (overview)
- 1924; 1928; 1932; 1936; 1948; 1952; 1956; 1960; 1964; 1968; 1972; 1976; 1980; 1984; 1988; 1992; 1994; 1998; 2002; 2006; 2010; 2014; 2018; 2022; 2026

Finland competed at the 2006 Winter Olympics in Turin, Italy, with 102 athletes competing in 11 of the 15 sports.

Janne Lahtela, a moguls freestyle skier and a defending Olympic champion, was the flag bearer at the Opening Ceremonies.

== Medalists ==
Medal	Name	Sport	Event	Date
Silver	Tanja Poutiainen	Alpine skiing	Women's giant slalom	24 February
Silver	Markku Uusipaavalniemi; Wille Mäkelä; Kalle Kiiskinen; Teemu Salo; Jani Sullanmaa	Curling	Men's	24 February
Silver	Mikko Ronkainen	Freestyle skiing	Men's moguls	15 February
Silver	Finland men's national ice hockey team: Aki Berg; Lasse Kukkonen; Toni Lydman; Antti-Jussi Niemi; Petteri Nummelin; Teppo Numminen; Sami Salo; Kimmo Timonen; Niklas Hagman; Jukka Hentunen; Olli Jokinen; Jussi Jokinen; Niko Kapanen; Saku Koivu; Mikko Koivu; Antti Laaksonen; Jere Lehtinen; Ville Nieminen; Ville Peltonen; Jarkko Ruutu; Teemu Selänne; Niklas Bäckström; Antero Niittymäki; Fredrik Norrena	Ice hockey	Men's competition	26 February
Silver	Matti Hautamäki	Ski jumping	Normal hill	12 February
Silver	Janne Ahonen; Janne Happonen; Matti Hautamäki; Tami Kiuru	Ski jumping	Men's team	20 February
Bronze	Aino-Kaisa Saarinen; Virpi Kuitunen	Cross-country skiing	Women's team sprint	14 February
Bronze	Antti Kuisma; Anssi Koivuranta; Jaakko Tallus; Hannu Manninen	Nordic combined	Team	16 February
Bronze	Markku Koski	Snowboarding	Men's halfpipe	12 February

== Alpine skiing ==
Athlete	Event	Final				
Athlete	Event	Run 1	Run 2	Run 3	Total	Rank
Kalle Palander	Men's giant slalom	1:18.22	1:18.60	n/a	2:36.82	9
Kalle Palander	Men's slalom	53.38	disqualified			
Tanja Poutiainen	Women's giant slalom	1:01.21	1:08.65	n/a	2:09.86	Silver medal
Tanja Poutiainen	Women's slalom	43.05	47.74	n/a	1:30.79	6
Henna Raita	Women's slalom	44.29	48.04	n/a	1:32.33	20
Jukka Rajala	Men's giant slalom	1:20.17	1:21.23	n/a	2:41.40	22
Jukka Rajala	Men's slalom	did not finish				

Note: In the men's combined, run 1 is the downhill, and runs 2 and 3 are the slalom. In the women's combined, run 1 and 2 are the slalom, and run 3 the downhill.

== Biathlon ==
Paavo Puurunen was the only Finnish biathlete who competed in Torino.

Athlete	Event	Final		
Athlete	Event	Time	Misses	Rank
Paavo Puurunen	Men's sprint	28:57.3	2	46
Paavo Puurunen	Men's pursuit	38:01.28	3	22
Paavo Puurunen	Men's mass start	47:43.7	0	4
Paavo Puurunen	Men's individual	56:38.9	1	12

== Cross-country skiing ==
Six men and six women participated in the cross-country skiing events, making the cross-country skiing squad the largest squad for any individual sport.

Distance

Men

Athlete	Event	Final	
Athlete	Event	Total	Rank
Sami Jauhojärvi	15 km classical	39:15.3	9
Sami Jauhojärvi	30 km pursuit	1:17:58.1	20
Teemu Kattilakoski	50 km freestyle	2:09:26.2	43
Ville Nousiainen	50 km freestyle	Did not finish	
Olli Ohtonen	15 km classical	41:47.4	48
Olli Ohtonen	30 kilometre pursuit	Did not start	
Olli Ohtonen	50 km freestyle	2:11:54.7	52
Lauri Pyykönen	15 km classical	42:10.4	55
Tero Similä	15 km classical	40:44.5	32
Tero Similä	30 km pursuit	1:20:04.5	34
Sami Jauhojärvi; Tero Similä; Olli Ohtonen; Teemu Kattilakoski	4 x 10 km relay	40:44.5	10

Women

Athlete	Event	Final	
Athlete	Event	Total	Rank
Elina Hietamäki	15 km pursuit	46:20.5	33
Virpi Kuitunen	10 km classical	28:51.4	9
Virpi Kuitunen	30 km freestyle	Did not finish	
Riitta-Liisa Lassila	10 km classical	30:28.4	35
Riitta-Liisa Lassila	15 km pursuit	44:06.1	13
Riitta-Liisa Lassila	30 km freestyle	1:26:55.4	23
Aino-Kaisa Saarinen	10 km classical	28:29.6	7
Aino-Kaisa Saarinen	30 km freestyle	1:25:41.8	17
Kirsi Välimaa	15 km pursuit	46:25.6	34
Kati Venäläinen	10 km classical	31:04.9	43
Kati Venäläinen	30 km freestyle	Did not finish	
Aino-Kaisa Saarinen; Virpi Kuitunen; Riitta-Liisa Lassila; Kati Venäläinen	4 x 5 km relay	55:55.8	7

Sprint

Athlete	Event	Qualifying		Quarterfinal		Semifinal		Final	
Athlete	Event	Total	Rank	Total	Rank	Total	Rank	Total	Rank
Elina Hietamäki	Women's sprint	2:20.49	42	Did not advance					42
Sami Jauhojärvi	Men's sprint	2:28.42	61	Did not advance					61
Virpi Kuitunen	Women's sprint	2:14.83	7 Q	2:16.2	2 Q	2:16.3	3	Final B 2:18.1	5
Keijo Kurttila	Men's sprint	2:19.94	22 Q	2:25.1	5	Did not advance			23
Lauri Pyykönen	Men's sprint	2:20.21	26 Q	2:28.6	6	Did not advance			27
Aino-Kaisa Saarinen	Women's sprint	2:15.75	11 Q	2:20.7	6	Did not advance			26
Kati Venäläinen	Women's sprint	2:17.29	24 Q	2:18.1	6	Did not advance			29
Keijo Kurttila; Lauri Pyykönen	Men's team sprint	n/a				17:21.5	4 Q	17:39.2	5
Virpi Kuitunen; Aino-Kaisa Saarinen	Women's team sprint	n/a				17:16.8	1 Q	16:39.2	Bronze medal

== Curling ==
=== Men's ===
: Markku Uusipaavalniemi (skip), Wille Mäkelä, Kalle Kiiskinen, Teemu Salo, Jani Sullanmaa (alternate)

Finland sent a men's curling team to the Olympics, the same team which finished fifth at the 2005 Ford World Men's Curling Championship.

Round-robin
Draw 1

Team	1	2	3	4	5	6	7	8	9	10	Final
Finland (Uusipaavalniemi)	0	1	0	1	0	0	0	0	0	X	2
Switzerland (Stöckli) 🔨	2	0	1	0	0	1	2	0	1	X	7

;Draw 2

Team	1	2	3	4	5	6	7	8	9	10	Final
Finland (Uusipaavalniemi)	0	0	0	2	0	0	0	1	0	1	4
United States (Fenson) 🔨	0	2	0	0	0	1	0	0	0	0	3

;Draw 4

Team	1	2	3	4	5	6	7	8	9	10	Final
Finland (Uusipaavalniemi) 🔨	0	0	2	0	0	0	2	0	0	2	6
New Zealand (Becker)	0	2	0	0	1	1	0	1	0	0	5

;Draw 5

Team	1	2	3	4	5	6	7	8	9	10	Final
Germany (Kapp) 🔨	0	0	1	0	0	2	0	1	1	0	5
Finland (Uusipaavalniemi)	0	0	0	0	1	0	0	0	0	1	2

;Draw 7

Team	1	2	3	4	5	6	7	8	9	10	Final
Sweden (Lindholm)	0	2	0	2	0	0	0	0	X	X	4
Finland (Uusipaavalniemi)	3	0	2	0	0	1	3	2	X	X	11

;Draw 8

Team	1	2	3	4	5	6	7	8	9	10	Final
Finland (Uusipaavalniemi) 🔨	0	0	3	0	0	0	4	1	0	0	8
Canada (Gushue)	2	0	0	0	1	1	0	0	2	1	7

;Draw 9

Team	1	2	3	4	5	6	7	8	9	10	Final
Finland (Uusipaavalniemi) 🔨	1	0	0	1	3	0	1	0	0	1	7
Norway (Trulsen)	0	0	1	0	0	1	0	1	0	0	3

;Draw 10

Team	1	2	3	4	5	6	7	8	9	10	Final
Italy (Retornaz) 🔨	0	1	0	1	1	0	1	0	0	0	4
Finland (Uusipaavalniemi)	1	0	2	0	0	2	0	0	1	1	7

;Draw 11

Team	1	2	3	4	5	6	7	8	9	10	Final
Great Britain (Murdoch) 🔨	0	0	0	0	1	0	0	0	1	X	2
Finland (Uusipaavalniemi)	0	0	3	0	0	1	1	0	0	X	5

Standings

Rank	Team	Skip	Won	Lost
1	Finland	Markku Uusipaavalniemi	7	2
2	Canada	Brad Gushue	6	3
3	United States	Pete Fenson	6	3
4	Great Britain	David Murdoch	6	3
5	Norway	Pål Trulsen	5	4
6	Switzerland	Ralph Stockli	5	4
7	Italy	Joel Retornaz	4	5
8	Sweden	Peter Lindholm	3	6
9	Germany	Andy Kapp	3	6
10	New Zealand	Sean Becker	0	9

Playoffs
Semifinal

Team	1	2	3	4	5	6	7	8	9	10	Final
Finland (Uusipaavalniemi) 🔨	0	1	0	0	0	2	0	0	0	1	4
Great Britain (Murdoch)	0	0	0	0	1	0	1	0	1	0	3

;Final

Team	1	2	3	4	5	6	7	8	9	10	11	Final
Finland (Uusipavaalniemi)	2	0	0	0	1	0	0	1	x	x	-	5
Canada (Gushue) 🔨	0	2	1	1	0	6	0	0	x	x	-	11

== Figure skating ==
Susanna Pöykiö and Kiira Korpi were selected for the women's competition. Pöykiö has won a silver at the 2005 European Figure Skating Championships (held in Torino), while Korpi's best European placing prior to the Olympics was sixth.

Athlete	Event	CD		SP/OD		FS/FD		Total	
Athlete	Event	Points	Rank	Points	Rank	Points	Rank	Points	Rank
Kiira Korpi	Ladies'	n/a		44.84	20 Q	92.36	14	137.20	16
Susanna Pöykiö	Ladies'	n/a		53.74	12 Q	89.48	15	143.22	13

Key: CD = Compulsory Dance, FD = Free Dance, FS = Free Skate, OD = Original Dance, SP = Short Program

== Freestyle skiing ==
Five Finnish men were entered in the freestyle competition, all in the moguls Since only four entrants were allowed, Tapio Luusua ended up as an alternate.

Athlete	Event	Qualifying		Final	
Athlete	Event	Points	Rank	Points	Rank
Janne Lahtela	Men's moguls	23.77	10 Q	22.65	16
Juuso Lahtela	Men's moguls	22.31	19 Q	24.42	8
Sami Mustonen	Men's moguls	21.57	22	did not advance	
Mikko Ronkainen	Men's moguls	23.38	13 Q	26.62	Silver medal

== Ice hockey ==
=== Men's ===
The Finnish men's team finished atop its Round-robin group, which including beating both previous Olympic gold medalists, the Czech Republic and Canada, and beat the United States and Russia to make the final, where it lost to Sweden to finish in the silver medal position.

Roster

The following is the Finnish roster for the men's ice hockey tournament at the 2006 Winter Olympics.

Head coach: Erkka Westerlund

Assistant coaches: Risto Dufva, Hannu Virta

No.	Pos.	Name	Height	Weight	Birthdate	Team
3	D	Petteri Nummelin	5 ft 10 in (178 cm)	194 lb (88 kg)	November 25, 1972 (aged 33)	(Switzerland) HC Lugano
4	D	Kimmo Timonen (A)	5 ft 10 in (178 cm)	194 lb (88 kg)	March 18, 1975 (aged 30)	(United States) Nashville Predators
5	D	Lasse Kukkonen	6 ft 0 in (183 cm)	187 lb (85 kg)	October 18, 1981 (aged 24)	(Finland) Kärpät
6	D	Sami Salo	6 ft 3 in (191 cm)	216 lb (98 kg)	March 22, 1974 (aged 31)	(Canada) Vancouver Canucks
7	D	Aki Berg	6 ft 4 in (193 cm)	214 lb (97 kg)	July 28, 1977 (aged 28)	(Canada) Toronto Maple Leafs
8	F	Teemu Selänne	6 ft 0 in (183 cm)	201 lb (91 kg)	July 3, 1970 (aged 35)	(United States) Mighty Ducks of Anaheim
10	F	Ville Nieminen	6 ft 0 in (183 cm)	207 lb (94 kg)	April 6, 1977 (aged 28)	(United States) New York Rangers
11	F	Saku Koivu (C)	5 ft 10 in (178 cm)	181 lb (82 kg)	November 23, 1974 (aged 31)	(Canada) Montreal Canadiens
12	F	Olli Jokinen	6 ft 2 in (188 cm)	209 lb (95 kg)	December 5, 1978 (aged 27)	(United States) Florida Panthers
14	F	Niklas Hagman	6 ft 0 in (183 cm)	205 lb (93 kg)	December 5, 1979 (aged 26)	(United States) Dallas Stars
16	F	Ville Peltonen	5 ft 11 in (180 cm)	187 lb (85 kg)	March 24, 1973 (aged 32)	(Switzerland) HC Lugano
21	F	Mikko Koivu	6 ft 2 in (188 cm)	214 lb (97 kg)	March 12, 1983 (aged 22)	(United States) Minnesota Wild
24	F	Antti Laaksonen	6 ft 0 in (183 cm)	181 lb (82 kg)	October 3, 1973 (aged 32)	(United States) Colorado Avalanche
25	F	Jukka Hentunen	5 ft 10 in (178 cm)	198 lb (90 kg)	May 3, 1974 (aged 31)	(Switzerland) HC Lugano
26	F	Jere Lehtinen	6 ft 0 in (183 cm)	194 lb (88 kg)	June 24, 1973 (aged 32)	(United States) Dallas Stars
27	D	Teppo Numminen (A)	6 ft 1 in (185 cm)	198 lb (90 kg)	July 3, 1968 (aged 37)	(United States) Buffalo Sabres
30	G	Fredrik Norrena	6 ft 0 in (183 cm)	190 lb (86 kg)	November 29, 1973 (aged 32)	(Sweden) Linköping HC
31	G	Antero Niittymäki	6 ft 1 in (185 cm)	190 lb (86 kg)	June 18, 1980 (aged 25)	(United States) Philadelphia Flyers
32	D	Toni Lydman	6 ft 1 in (185 cm)	201 lb (91 kg)	September 25, 1975 (aged 30)	(United States) Buffalo Sabres
33	G	Niklas Bäckström	6 ft 2 in (188 cm)	192 lb (87 kg)	February 13, 1978 (aged 28)	(Finland) Kärpät
36	F	Jussi Jokinen	6 ft 0 in (183 cm)	192 lb (87 kg)	April 1, 1983 (aged 22)	(United States) Dallas Stars
37	F	Jarkko Ruutu	6 ft 1 in (185 cm)	203 lb (92 kg)	August 23, 1975 (aged 30)	(Canada) Vancouver Canucks
39	F	Niko Kapanen	5 ft 10 in (178 cm)	176 lb (80 kg)	April 29, 1978 (aged 27)	(United States) Dallas Stars
77	D	Antti-Jussi Niemi	6 ft 1 in (185 cm)	187 lb (85 kg)	September 29, 1977 (aged 28)	(Sweden) Frölunda HC

Round-robin

Pos	Team	Pld	W	D	L	GF	GA	GD	Pts	Qualification
1	Finland	5	5	0	0	19	2	+17	10	Quarterfinals
2	Switzerland	5	2	2	1	10	12	−2	6	Quarterfinals
3	Canada	5	3	0	2	15	9	+6	6	Quarterfinals
4	Czech Republic	5	2	0	3	14	12	+2	4	Quarterfinals
5	Germany	5	0	2	3	7	16	−9	2	
6	Italy (H)	5	0	2	3	9	23	−14	2	

Source: IIHF
(H) Hosts

15 February 2006; 15:35	Switzerland	0–5 (0–1, 0–4, 0–0)	Finland	Torino Esposizioni, Turin; Attendance: 2,960

Game reference

Martin Gerber (out 40:00)
David Aebischer (in 40:00)
Goalies
Antero Niittymäki
Referee:
(Canada) Don Van Massenhoven
Linesmen:
(Sweden) Joacim Karlsson
(United States) Thor Nelson

0–1	13:07 – O. Jokinen (V. Peltonen) (PP)
0–2	23:35 – T. Numminen (T. Selänne, J. Lehtinen) (PP)
0–3	28:04 – O. Jokinen (V. Peltonen, J. Jokinen) (PP)
0–4	33:25 – T. Selänne (S. Koivu)
0–5	39:25 – T. Selänne (J. Lehtinen, O. Jokinen)

10 min
Penalties
8 min
24
Shots
37

16 February 2006; 12:05	Finland	6–0 (0–0, 4–0, 2–0)	Italy	Palasport Olimpico, Turin; Attendance: 7,776

Game reference

Fredrik Norrena
Goalies
Günther Hell
Referee:
(Russia) Vyacheslav Bulanov
Linesmen:
(Slovakia) Milan Mášik
(United States) Kevin Redding

J. Lehtinen (T. Numminen) (PP) – 21:49	1–0
S. Koivu (T. Numminen) (PP) – 23:51	2–0
J. Jokinen (P. Nummelin, S. Salo) (PP) – 30:11	3–0
V. Peltonen (P. Nummelin) (PP) – 38:25	4–0
T. Selänne (S. Koivu, S. Salo) (PP2) – 52:07	5–0
T. Selänne (J. Lehtinen) – 55:08	6–0

4 min
Penalties
22 min
51
Shots
16

18 February 2006; 21:05	Czech Republic	2–4 (1–1, 1–1, 0–2)	Finland	Palasport Olimpico, Turin; Attendance: 8,705

Game reference

Tomáš Vokoun
Goalies
Antero Niittymäki
Referee:
(Sweden) Thomas Andersson
Linesmen:
(United States) Tony Sericolo
(Russia) Sergei Shelyanin

M. Židlický (R. Lang, M. Hejduk) (PP) – 8:25	1–0
	1–1	14:14 – O. Jokinen (S. Koivu, V. Peltonen)
	1–2	35:02 – J. Lehtinen (K. Timonen) (PP)
M. Židlický (R. Lang, J. Špaček) (PP2) – 38:17	2–2
	2–3	40:30 – T. Selänne (J. Lehtinen, S. Koivu)
	2–4	48:33 – J. Lehtinen (S. Koivu, T. Selänne)

12 min
Penalties
39 min
39
Shots
32

19 February 2006; 21:05	Finland	2–0 (2–0, 0–0, 0–0)	Canada	Torino Esposizioni, Turin; Attendance: 4,420

Game reference
Antero Niittymäki	Goalies	Roberto Luongo	Referee: (Czech Republic) Vladimír Šindler; Linesmen: (Slovakia) Milan Mášik (United States) Thor Nelson
T. Selänne (S. Koivu) – 11:14 / 1–0; N. Kapanen (V. Nieminen, K. Timonen) – 15:02 / 2–0			Referee: (Czech Republic) Vladimír Šindler; Linesmen: (Slovakia) Milan Mášik (United States) Thor Nelson
6 min	Penalties	12 min	Referee: (Czech Republic) Vladimír Šindler; Linesmen: (Slovakia) Milan Mášik (United States) Thor Nelson
30	Shots	24	Referee: (Czech Republic) Vladimír Šindler; Linesmen: (Slovakia) Milan Mášik (United States) Thor Nelson

21 February 2006; 15:35	Finland	2–0 (1–0, 1–0, 0–0)	Germany	Torino Esposizioni, Turin; Attendance: 2,430

Game reference
Fredrik Norrena	Goalies	Robert Müller	Referee: (Switzerland) Danny Kurmann; Linesmen: (Slovakia) Miroslav Halecký (United States) Kevin Redding
N. Kapanen (N. Hagman, S. Koivu) (PP) – 2:35 / 1–0; S. Koivu (J. Lehtinen, T. Selänne) – 39:39 / 2–0			Referee: (Switzerland) Danny Kurmann; Linesmen: (Slovakia) Miroslav Halecký (United States) Kevin Redding
6 min	Penalties	18 min	Referee: (Switzerland) Danny Kurmann; Linesmen: (Slovakia) Miroslav Halecký (United States) Kevin Redding
25	Shots	18	Referee: (Switzerland) Danny Kurmann; Linesmen: (Slovakia) Miroslav Halecký (United States) Kevin Redding

Medal round

Quarterfinal

22 February 2006; 17:35	Finland	4–3 (2–1, 2–1, 0–1)	United States	Palasport Olimpico, Turin; Attendance: 6,691

Game reference

Antero Niittymäki
Goalies
Rick DiPietro
Referee:
(Canada) Paul Devorski
Linesmen:
(Slovakia) Milan Mášik
(Canada) Steve Miller

V. Peltonen (J. Jokinen, S. Salo) – 9:33	1–0
S. Salo (SH) − 12:01	2–0
	2–1	13:14 – M. Knuble (M. Schneider, D. Weight)
	2–2	21:29 − M. Schneider (B. Rafalski, C. Conroy) (PP)
O. Jokinen (V. Peltonen) (PP) – 25:06	3–2
O. Jokinen (PP2) – 37:10	4–2
	4–3	55:33 – B. Gionta (C. Drury, E. Cole)

16 min
Penalties
30 min
25
Shots
28

Semifinal

24 February 2006; 21:05	Finland	4–0 (1–0, 2–0, 1–0)	Russia	Palasport Olimpico, Turin; Attendance: 8,702

Game reference

Antero Niittymäki
Goalies
Evgeni Nabokov
Referee:
(Canada) Don Van Massenhoven
Linesmen:
(Slovakia) Milan Mášik
(United States) Tony Sericolo

V. Peltonen (K. Timonen) (PP) – 6:13	1–0
T. Lydman (S. Koivu) – 29:33	2–0
S. Koivu (K. Timonen, T. Selänne) (PP) – 33:51	3–0
O. Jokinen (V. Peltonen, N. Kapanen) – 49:17	4–0

8 min
Penalties
16 min
30
Shots
21

Final

26 February 2006; 14:05	Finland	2–3 (1–0, 1–2, 0–1)	Sweden	Palasport Olimpico, Turin; Attendance: 8,274

Game reference

Antero Niittymäki
Goalies
Henrik Lundqvist
Referee:
(Canada) Paul Devorski
Linesmen:
(Slovakia) Milan Mášik
(United States) Thor Nelson

K. Timonen (T. Selänne) (PP) – 14:45	1–0
	1–1	24:42 – H. Zetterberg (M. Samuelsson, C. Bäckman) (PP)
	1–2	33:24 – N. Kronwall (H. Zetterberg) (PP)
V. Peltonen (J. Jokinen, O. Jokinen) – 35:00	2–2
	2–3	40:10 – N. Lidström (M. Sundin, P. Forsberg)

14 min
Penalties
14 min
27
Shots
28

=== Women's ===
The Finnish women's team finished second to the United States in the round-robin section of the competition, but lost to both North American teams in the medal round to end up in fourth place.

Players

No.	Position	Name	S / C	Height	Weight	Birthdate	Birthplace	2004–05 team
10	F	Sari Fisk – C	L	163	65	12/17/71	Pori	Espoo Blues
30	G	Maija Hassinen	L	161	52	01/02/84	Hämeenlinna	Ilves
15	F	Satu Hoikkala	R	165	63	01/14/80	Vantaa	Kärpät
5	D	Satu Kiipeli	L	174	72	12/24/80	Raahe	IHK
24	D	Kati Kovalainen – A	L	165	64	01/24/75	Leppävirta	IHK
2	D	Hanna Kuoppala	L	179	77	09/12/75	Jakobstad	Espoo Blues
3	D	Emma Laaksonen – A	L	159	60	12/17/81	Washington, D.C.	Espoo Blues
9	D	Terhi Mertanen	L	164	64	04/04/81	Joensuu	Kärpät
27	F	Marja-Helena Pälvilä	L	176	70	03/04/70	Oulu	Kärpät
11	F	Oona Parviainen	L	170	63	09/05/77	Kuopio	Espoo Blues
25	F	Mari Pehkonen	L	170	63	02/06/85	Tampere	University of Minnesota Duluth
4	D	Heidi Pelttari	L	165	68	08/02/85	Tampere	Ilves
29	F	Karoliina Rantamäki	L	163	68	02/23/78	Vantaa	Espoo Blues
1	G	Noora Räty	L	163	56	05/29/89	Espoo	Espoo Blues
12	F	Mari Saarinen	L	172	63	07/30/81	Kangasala	Ilves
21	F	Eveliina Similä	L	164	68	04/10/78	Toijala	Ilves
20	D	Saija Sirviö	L	171	57	12/29/82	Oulu	Kärpät
18	F	Nora Tallus	R	158	67	02/09/81	Kerava	IHK
22	F	Saara Tuominen	L	169	64	01/01/86	Ylöjärvi	Ilves
8	F	Satu Tuominen	L	163	61	11/19/85	Vantaa	Espoo Blues

Round-robin

Pos	Team	Pld	W	D	L	GF	GA	GD	Pts	Qualification
1	United States	3	3	0	0	18	3	+15	6	Semifinals
2	Finland	3	2	0	1	10	7	+3	4	Semifinals
3	Germany	3	1	0	2	2	9	−7	2	5–8th place semifinals
4	Switzerland	3	0	0	3	1	12	−11	0	5–8th place semifinals

11 February 2006; 13:05	Finland	3–0 (2–0, 0–0, 1–0)	Germany	Torino Esposizioni, Turin; Attendance: 3,200

Game reference

Maija Hassinen
Goalies
Stephanie Wartosch-Kürten
Referee:
(Russia) Arina Ustinova
Linesmen:
(France) Anne-Sophie Boniface
(Czech Republic) Klára Quagliato

Pehkonen (Pelttari, Tuominen) – 08:15	1–0
Pelttari (PP2) – 17:02	2–0
Pälvilä (SH) – 43:13	3–0

4 min
Penalties
6 min
27
Shots
24

13 February 2006; 17:35	Finland	4–0 (1–0, 0–0, 3–0)	Switzerland	Palasport Olimpico, Turin; Attendance: 4,259

Game reference

Noora Räty
Goalies
Florence Schelling
Referee:
(Germany) Bianca Walter
Linesmen:
(Sweden) Annica Flödén
(Czech Republic) Jana Zítková

Tuominen (Pelttari) (PP) – 14:10	1–0
Rantamäki – 45:21	2–0
Saarinen (Hoikkala, Tallus) – 51:58	3–0
Pehkonen (Rantamaki) – 52:50	4–0

18 min
Penalties
20 min
41
Shots
18

14 February 2006; 20:35	United States	7–3 (1–2, 1–1, 5–0)	Finland	Palasport Olimpico, Turin; Attendance: 7,697

Game reference

Chanda Gunn
Goalies
Maija Hassinen
Referee:
(Canada) Stephanie Normand
Linesmen:
(Czech Republic) Klára Quagliato
(Canada) Kim Robichaud

	0–1	00:13 – Pehkonen (Rantamäki)
Parsons (Wendell, Potter) (PP) – 08:08	1–1
	1–2	11:26 – Laaksonen (Tuominen) (PP)
	1–3	32:01 – Kovalainen (Saarinen) (PP2)
Parsons (Chu) – 38:54	2–3
Ka. King – 41:28	3–3
Ruggiero – 50:16	4–3
Darwitz (Wall) (PP) – 51:01	5–3
Wendell (Parsons, Ruggiero) – 52:18	6–3
Ruggiero (Darwitz, Stephens) – 55:36	7–3

38 min
Penalties
22 min
31
Shots
15

Medal round

Semifinal

17 February 2006; 21:05	Canada	6–0 (2–0, 2–0, 2–0)	Finland	Palasport Olimpico, Turin; Attendance: 7,306

Game reference

Charline Labonté
Goalies
Maija Hassinen
Noora Räty
Referee:
(United States) Danyel Howard
Linesmen:
(United States) Julie Piacentini
(Czech Republic) Klára Quagliato

Weatherston (Sostorics) (PP) – 17:33	1–0
Apps (Kingsbury, Goyette) (PP) – 19:15	2–0
Wickenheiser (Apps) (PP) – 34:59	3–0
Ouellette (Sunohara) (PP) – 36:26	4–0
Piper (Wickenheiser, Apps) – 47:49	5–0
Piper (Wickenheiser, Apps) (PP) – 54:47	6–0

14 min
Penalties
16 min
40
Shots
17

Bronze medal game

20 February 2006; 16:35	Finland	0–4 (0–3, 0–1, 0–0)	United States (bronze)	Palasport Olimpico, Turin; Attendance: 5,150

Game reference

Noora Räty
Maija Hassinen
Goalies
Chanda Gunn
Referee:
(United Kingdom) Joy Tottman
Linesmen:
(Germany) Michaela Kiefer
(Canada) Kim Robichaud

0–1	02:32 – Stephens (Chu, Darwitz) (PP)
0–2	08:09 – Ka. King (Resor)
0–3	11:06 – Ka. King (Potter)
0–4	21:44 – Ka. King (Chu, Kr. King)

12 min
Penalties
20 min
14
Shots
20

== Nordic combined ==
Athlete	Event	Ski jumping		Cross-country		
Athlete	Event	Points	Rank	Deficit	Time	Rank
Anssi Koivuranta	Sprint	121.5	3	0:17	19:17.7 +48.7	11
Anssi Koivuranta	Individual Gundersen	220.5	18	2:48	43:37.3 +3:52.7	25
Antti Kuisma	Individual Gundersen	217.5	22	3:00	42:33.8 +2:49.2	17
Hannu Manninen	Sprint	108.3	16	1:10	19:21.0 +52.0	12
Hannu Manninen	Individual Gundersen	238.0	8	1:38	41:20.2 +1:35.6	9
Janne Ryynänen	Sprint	102.5	29	1:33	20:47.6 +2:18.6	37
Jaakko Tallus	Sprint	120.9	4	0:19	18:58.1 +29.1	5
Jaakko Tallus	Individual Gundersen	257.0	3	0:22	40:01.9 +17.3	5
Anssi Koivuranta; Antti Kuisma; Hannu Manninen; Jaakko Tallus	Team	878.6	4	0:35	50:19.4 +26.8	Bronze medal

Note: 'Deficit' refers to the amount of time behind the leader a competitor began the cross-country portion of the event. Italicized numbers show the final deficit from the winner's finishing time.

== Ski jumping ==
Athlete	Event	Qualifying		First round		Final		
Athlete	Event	Points	Rank	Points	Rank	Points	Total	Rank
Janne Ahonen	Normal hill	133.5	3 PQ	134.5	2 Q	127.0	261.5	6
Janne Ahonen	Large hill	136.3	2 PQ	112.3	9 Q	121.8	234.1	9
Janne Happonen	Normal hill	114.0	23 Q	116.0	26 Q	109.0	225.0	28
Matti Hautamäki	Normal hill	130.0	5 PQ	131.0	6 Q	134.5	265.5	Silver medal
Matti Hautamäki	Large hill	129.6	5 PQ	117.3	7 Q	125.1	242.4	5
Risto Jussilainen	Large hill	97.2	10 Q	91.7	35	did not advance		35
Tami Kiuru	Normal hill	125.0	8 Q	113.0	31	did not advance		31
Tami Kiuru	Large hill	95.3	12 Q	108.6	13 Q	105.4	214.0	18
Tami Kiuru; Janne Happonen; Janne Ahonen; Matti Hautamäki	Team	n/a		467.2	2 Q	509.4	976.6	Silver medal

Note: PQ indicates a skier was pre-qualified for the final, based on entry rankings.

== Snowboarding ==
Halfpipe

Athlete	Event	Qualifying run 1		Qualifying run 2		Final		
Athlete	Event	Points	Rank	Points	Rank	Run 1	Run 2	Rank
Antti Autti	Men's halfpipe	43.5	2 Q	n/a		(28.2)	39.1	5
Janne Korpi	Men's halfpipe	9.2	42	33.5	14	did not advance		20
Markku Koski	Men's halfpipe	20.2	28	40.6	3 Q	41.5	(31.4)	Bronze medal
Risto Mattila	Men's halfpipe	40.8	5 Q	n/a		(31.6)	35.8	10

Note: In the final, the single best score from two runs is used to determine the ranking. A bracketed score indicates a run that wasn't counted.

Parallel GS

Athlete	Event	Qualification		Round of 16	Quarterfinals	Semifinals	Finals	
Athlete	Event	Time	Rank	Opposition Time	Opposition Time	Opposition Time	Opposition Time	Rank
Niina Sarias	Women's parallel giant slalom	1:24.96	24	did not advance				24

== Speed skating ==
Athlete	Event	Race 1		Final	
Athlete	Event	Time	Rank	Time	Rank
Janne Hänninen	Men's 500 m	35.58	35.67	1:11.25	15
Janne Hänninen	Men's 1000 m	n/a		1:10.83	25
Pekka Koskela	Men's 500 m	35.58	35.51	1:11.09	10
Pekka Koskela	Men's 1000 m	n/a		1:11.45	31
Mika Poutala	Men's 500 m	35.91	35.83	1:11.74	22
Mika Poutala	Men's 1000 m	n/a		1:11.03	26
Risto Rosendahl	Men's 1000 m	n/a		1:12.60	37
Risto Rosendahl	Men's 1500 m	n/a		1:49.51	24
