= FIS Nordic World Ski Championships 2007 – Women's 10 kilometre freestyle =

Women's 10 km freestyle interval start at the FIS Nordic World Ski Championships 2007
- Venue: Shirahatayama Open Stadium
- Date: 27 February 2007
- Competitors: 77
- Winning time: 23:58.4

Medalists
gold medal	Kateřina Neumannová	Czech Republic
silver medal	Olga Zavyalova	Russia
bronze medal	Arianna Follis	Italy

The Women's 10 kilometre freestyle was part of the FIS Nordic World Ski Championships 2007's events held in Sapporo, Japan. The race went underway on 27 February 2007 at 15:00 CET at Shirahatayama cross-country course in Sapporo. The defending world champion was Czech Republic's Katerina Neumannova, who successfully defended her title.

== Results ==
Rank	Bib	Athlete	Country	Time	Deficit
1st place, gold medalist(s)	76	Kateřina Neumannová	Czech Republic	23:58.4	—
2nd place, silver medalist(s)	68	Olga Zavyalova	Russia	24:24.9	+26.5
3rd place, bronze medalist(s)	64	Arianna Follis	Italy	24:28.6	+30.2
4	65	Kristin Størmer Steira	Norway	24:33.9	+35.5
5	58	Charlotte Kalla	Sweden	24:41.9	+43.5
6	66	Evi Sachenbacher-Stehle	Germany	24:44.4	+46.0
7	75	Riitta-Liisa Roponen	Finland	24:48.4	+50.0
8	72	Valentyna Shevchenko	Ukraine	24:51.7	+53.3
9	71	Kristina Šmigun	Estonia	24:56.3	+57.9
10	63	Natalya Korostelyova	Russia	24:57.2	+58.8
11	60	Yevgeniya Medvedeva	Russia	25:09.5	+1:11.1
12	42	Magda Genuin	Italy	25:12.0	+1:13.6
13	57	Sabina Valbusa	Italy	25:15.4	+1:17.0
14	56	Oxana Yatskaya	Kazakhstan	25:22.7	+1:24.3
15	62	Claudia Künzel-Nystad	Germany	25:28.6	+1:30.2
16	51	Yuliya Chekalyova	Russia	25:28.8	+1:30.4
17	30	Lada Nesterenko	Ukraine	25:31.3	+1:32.9
18	70	Justyna Kowalczyk	Poland	25:32.5	+1:34.1
19	53	Kristin Mürer Stemland	Norway	25:36.6	+1:38.2
20	38	Anna Dahlberg	Sweden	25:37.7	+1:39.3
21	69	Vibeke Skofterud	Norway	25:40.7	+1:42.3
22	74	Marit Bjørgen	Norway	25:50.6	+1:52.2
23	52	Antonella Confortola	Italy	25:50.9	+1:52.5
24	50	Sara Lindborg	Sweden	25:52.8	+1:54.4
25	40	Silvana Bucher	Switzerland	25:56.9	+1:58.5
26	45	Elena Kolomina	Kazakhstan	25:57.2	+1:58.8
27	49	Stefanie Böhler	Germany	25:57.3	+1:58.9
28	61	Svetlana Malahova	Kazakhstan	25:57.6	+1:59.2
29	59	Katrin Zeller	Germany	26:00.1	+2:01.7
30	29	Irina Terentjeva	Lithuania	26:04.1	+2:05.7
31	35	Olga Vasiljonok	Belarus	26:07.3	+2:08.9
32	47	Ivana Janečková	Czech Republic	26:09.2	+2:10.8
33	46	Milla Saari	Finland	26:09.6	+2:11.2
34	43	Alena Procházková	Slovakia	26:18.4	+2:20.0
35	16	Maryna Antsybor	Ukraine	26:18.8	+2:20.4
36	41	Alena Sannikova	Belarus	26:20.5	+2:22.1
37	37	Eva Vrabcová-Nývltová	Czech Republic	26:24.5	+2:26.1
38	67	Karine Philippot	France	26:26.7	+2:28.3
39	55	Yuanyuan Liu	China	26:29.1	+2:30.7
40	33	Ludmila Shablouskaya	Belarus	26:30.0	+2:31.6
41	36	Seraina Boner	Switzerland	26:36.0	+2:37.6
42	54	Lina Andersson	Sweden	26:36.3	+2:37.9
43	39	Li Hongxue	China	26:37.6	+2:39.2
44	14	Viktoria Lopatina	Belarus	26:42.0	+2:43.6
45	25	Natalya Issachenko	Kazakhstan	26:48.9	+2:50.5
46	13	Katarína Garajová	Slovakia	26:51.2	+2:52.8
47	31	Daria Gaiazova	Canada	26:52.0	+2:53.6
48	34	Chizuru Soneta	Japan	26:53.1	+2:54.7
49	48	Helena Erbenová	Czech Republic	26:59.3	+3:00.9
50	27	Tasha Betcherman	Canada	27:02.6	+3:04.2
51	23	Chae-Won Lee	South Korea	27:03.5	+3:05.1
52	21	Lindsey Weier	United States	27:08.0	+3:09.6
53	1	Nathalie Santer	Belgium	27:12.0	+3:13.6
54	44	Natascia Leonardi Cortesi	Switzerland	27:18.6	+3:20.2
55	26	Sarah Konrad	United States	27:36.3	+3:37.9
56	32	Tatjana Mannima	Estonia	27:36.4	+3:38.0
57	17	Vesna Fabjan	Slovenia	27:46.6	+3:48.2
58	28	Kaili Sirge	Estonia	27:50.1	+3:51.7
59	24	Chandra Crawford	Canada	27:59.7	+4:01.3
60	9	Caitlin Compton	United States	28:05.3	+4:06.9
61	15	Sarah Daitch	Canada	28:09.0	+4:10.6
62	18	Katherine Calder	Australia	28:22.0	+4:23.6
63	12	Song Bo	China	28:30.6	+4:32.2
64	11	Olga Reshetkova	Kyrgyzstan	29:11.1	+5:12.7
65	19	Rayna Kouva	Bulgaria	29:28.1	+5:29.7
66	10	Katja Višnar	Slovenia	30:06.4	+6:08.0
67	8	Samantha Bondarenko	New Zealand	32:08.3	+8:09.9
68	6	Jaqueline Mourão	Brazil	32:21.4	+8:23.0
69	4	Syuzanna Varosyan	Armenia	33:14.7	+9:16.3
70	2	Katarina Kuzmina	Israel	35:46.0	+11:47.6
71	7	Viktoria Zambo	Hungary	41:59.3	+18:00.9
72	5	Franziska Becskehazy	Brazil	48:46.4	+24:48.0
—	20	Kelime Çetinkaya	Turkey	DSQ^{1}	—
—	22	Zoya Obiukh	Ukraine	DSQ^{1}	—
—	3	Hou Yuxia	China	DNS	—
—	73	Aino-Kaisa Saarinen	Finland	DNS	—
—	77	Virpi Kuitunen	Finland	DNS	—

- ^{1}Disqualified due to skier did not ski the entire marked course.
