= Cross-country skiing at the 2006 Winter Olympics – Women's 15 kilometre pursuit =

Women's 15 kilometre pursuit at the XX Olympic Winter Games
- Women's pursuit event
- Venue: Pragelato
- Dates: February 12, 2006
- Competitors: 67 from 28 nations
- Winning time: 42:48.7

Medalists
1st place, gold medalist(s)		Kristina Šmigun; Estonia
2nd place, silver medalist(s)		Kateřina Neumannová; Czech Republic
3rd place, bronze medalist(s)		Yevgeniya Medvedeva-Arbuzova; Russia

The Women's 15 kilometre pursuit cross-country skiing competition at the 2006 Winter Olympics in Turin, Italy was held on 12 February, at Pragelato.

== Background ==
The defending Olympic gold medalist, Beckie Scott, and silver medalist Kateřina Neumannová both qualified for the event. The bronze medalist, Viola Bauer, did not qualify. Marit Bjørgen was the overall leader in the World Cup standings prior to the Olympics. Yuliya Chepalova was the 2005 world champion.

== The race ==
Kristina Šmigun and Kateřina Neumannová were neck-and-neck coming into the stadium, but Šmigun was the quickest through the last straight and won by 1.9 seconds. Russia's Yevgeniya Medvedeva-Arbuzova took bronze.

In 2014, the Estonian Olympic Committee was notified by the IOC that one of Šmigun's samples from the 2006 Turin Games had been retested with a positive result. On 24 October 2016, the World Anti-Doping Agency Athletes' Commission stated that Šmigun faces a Court of Arbitration for Sport hearing before the end of October. If Šmigun were to be stripped of her gold, Kateřina Neumannová of Czech Republic could be elevated to gold in the 15 km pursuit event.

== Results ==
The pursuit consisted of a 7.5 kilometre section raced in the classical style, followed by a 7.5 kilometre portion raced freestyle. In between, the sections, each skier took time to 'pit', changing their skis.

Rank	Bib	Name	Country	7.5 km classic	Rank	Pitstop	7.5 km free	Rank	Finish time	Deficit
1st place, gold medalist(s)	8	Kristina Šmigun	Estonia	20:24.9	2	36.5	21:47.2	1	42:48.7	
2nd place, silver medalist(s)	3	Kateřina Neumannová	Czech Republic	20:25.6	3	33.0	21:51.9	2	42:50.6	+1.9
3rd place, bronze medalist(s)	17	Yevgeniya Medvedeva-Arbuzova	Russia	20:28.4	11	34.5	22:00.1	3	43:03.2	+14.5
4	14	Kristin Størmer Steira	Norway	20:26.4	5	31.2	22:09.1	5	43:06.8	+18.1
5	19	Gabriella Paruzzi	Italy	20:26.5	6	33.9	22:19.0	6	43:18.9	+30.2
6	4	Beckie Scott	Canada	20:26.7	7	32.7	22:21.1	8	43:20.6	+31.9
7	23	Olga Zavyalova	Russia	20:28.3	10	36.1	22:19.3	7	43:23.7	+35.0
8	20	Justyna Kowalczyk	Poland	20:27.4	8	36.2	22:22.0	9	43:25.6	+36.9
9	2	Yuliya Chepalova	Russia	21:01.6	21	33.9	22:03.9	4	43:39.5	+50.8
10	5	Hilde G. Pedersen	Norway	20:26.0	4	34.1	22:40.4	10	43:40.5	+51.8
11	9	Petra Majdič	Slovenia	20:23.9	1	31.0	22:46.7	13	43:41.7	+53.0
12	12	Svetlana Malahova-Shishkina	Kazakhstan	20:40.8	15	34.2	22:44.9	12	44:00.0	+1:11.3
13	21	Riitta-Liisa Lassila	Finland	20:53.1	17	30.6	22:42.2	11	44:06.1	+1:17.4
14	7	Valentyna Shevchenko	Ukraine	20:37.0	13	35.6	23:00.9	14	44:13.6	+1:24.9
15	33	Britta Norgren	Sweden	20:28.7	12	32.7	23:16.5	19	44:18.0	+1:29.3
16	10	Sara Renner	Canada	20:27.8	9	32.9	23:30.1	21	44:30.9	+1:42.2
17	13	Sabina Valbusa	Italy	20:52.9	16	39.6	23:12.1	16	44:44.7	+1:56.0
18	6	Claudia Künzel	Germany	21:04.9	24	36.1	23:07.0	15	44:48.1	+1:59.4
19	15	Kristin Mürer Stemland	Norway	20:38.3	14	33.7	23:47.1	25	44:59.2	+2:10.5
20	11	Karine Philippot	France	20:53.4	18	35.7	23:37.3	22	45:06.5	+2:17.8
21	34	Wang Chunli	China	20:54.7	19	34.4	23:40.4	23	45:09.6	+2:20.9
22	32	Antonella Confortola	Italy	21:13.9	27	44.8	23:13.1	18	45:11.9	+2:23.2
23	42	Ivana Janečková	Czech Republic	21:14.7	28	34.6	23:44.2	24	45:33.5	+2:44.8
24	26	Natascia Leonardi Cortesi	Switzerland	21:00.9	20	37.8	23:55.5	28	45:34.3	+2:45.6
25	29	Elena Kolomina	Kazakhstan	21:04.4	23	38.8	24:00.8	30	45:44.1	+2:55.4
26	48	Vita Yakymchuk	Ukraine	21:58.1	39	37.1	23:12.8	17	45:48.1	+2:59.4
27	41	Li Hongxue	China	21:29.0	31	35.8	23:51.5	26	45:56.4	+3:07.7
28	16	Stefanie Böhler	Germany	21:08.5	25	36.2	24:12.0	35	45:56.9	+3:08.2
29	40	Helena Erbenová	Czech Republic	21:30.6	32	34.5	23:51.8	27	45:57.0	+3:08.3
30	30	Sumiko Yokoyama	Japan	21:19.1	29	32.9	24:06.5	32	45:58.6	+3:09.9
31	18	Elin Ek	Sweden	21:02.3	22	43.9	24:16.4	39	46:02.7	+3:14.0
32	67	Liu Yuanyuan	China	22:18.0	48	41.5	23:18.9	20	46:18.5	+3:29.8
33	31	Elina Hietamäki	Finland	21:47.7	35	36.1	23:56.6	29	46:20.5	+3:31.8
34	27	Kirsi Välimaa	Finland	21:08.7	26	40.1	24:36.7	46	46:25.6	+3:36.9
35	36	Masako Ishida	Japan	21:28.6	30	36.6	24:32.4	45	46:37.7	+3:49.0
36	22	Arianna Follis	Italy	21:40.1	33	36.8	24:24.0	41	46:40.9	+3:52.2
37	24	Yelena Burukhina	Russia	21:47.4	34	42.4	24:13.1	38	46:42.9	+3:54.2
38	43	Chizuru Soneta	Japan	21:59.2	40	36.3	24:09.9	34	46:45.5	+3:56.8
39	45	Maja Benedicic	Slovenia	22:01.6	42	40.6	24:08.8	33	46:51.1	+4:02.4
40	53	Kateryna Grygorenko	Ukraine	22:15.9	46	35.0	24:04.2	31	46:55.2	+4:06.5
41	25	Oxana Yatskaya	Kazakhstan	21:49.7	36	42.3	24:24.9	42	46:57.0	+4:08.3
42	52	Clare-Louise Brumley	Australia	21:54.9	38	38.1	24:30.0	44	47:03.1	+4:14.4
43	38	Alena Sannikova	Belarus	22:16.5	47	36.7	24:12.3	36	47:05.6	+4:16.9
44	39	Ludmila Korolik Shablouskaya	Belarus	22:09.3	44	44.8	24:13.0	37	47:07.2	+4:18.5
45	50	Tetyana Zavalíy	Ukraine	22:14.6	45	37.3	24:26.7	43	47:18.7	+4:30.0
46	49	Alena Procházková	Slovakia	21:53.5	37	40.2	25:11.4	51	47:45.2	+4:56.5
47	28	Anna-Karin Strömstedt	Sweden	22:01.6	42	36.2	25:13.5	52	47:51.3	+5:02.6
48	60	Rebecca Dussault	United States	22:30.4	53	39.0	24:44.2	47	47:53.7	+5:05.0
49	64	Ekaterina Rudakova Bulauka	Belarus	23:06.2	58	42.5	24:20.4	40	48:09.2	+5:20.5
50	65	Yevgeniya Voloshenko	Kazakhstan	22:19.6	50	42.5	25:15.0	54	48:17.2	+5:28.5
51	44	Olga Vasiljonok	Belarus	22:19.2	49	41.7	25:19.4	55	48:20.4	+5:31.7
52	35	Manuela Henkel	Germany	22:27.6	51	40.5	25:13.5	52	48:21.8	+5:33.1
53	37	Irina Terentjeva	Lithuania	23:01.3	56	36.9	24:55.4	49	48:33.7	+5:45.0
54	46	Milaine Thériault	Canada	22:01.2	41	41.1	25:56.5	58	48:38.9	+5:50.2
55	59	Lindsey Weier	United States	22:30.0	52	42.2	25:32.6	56	48:45.0	+5:56.3
56	51	Abby Larson	United States	23:19.2	60	39.4	24:48.8	48	48:47.5	+5:58.8
57	47	Lee Chae-Won	South Korea	23:18.7	59	46.2	24:56.3	50	49:01.2	+6:12.5
58	61	Xu Yinghui	China	22:35.3	54	42.3	26:29.6	61	49:47.3	+6:58.6
59	62	Mónika György	Romania	23:02.2	57	36.9	26:36.1	62	50:15.3	+7:26.6
60	63	Chandra Crawford	Canada	22:35.8	55	43.6	27:15.8	64	50:35.4	+7:46.7
61	54	Laia Aubert Torrents	Spain	24:03.5	61	34.2	26:03.4	59	50:41.3	+7:52.6
62	55	Lindsay Williams	United States	24:11.5	63	45.5	25:52.7	57	50:49.7	+8:01.0
63	58	Laura Orgué	Spain	24:13.0	64	42.0	26:21.4	60	51:16.5	+8:27.8
64	57	Maja Kezele	Croatia	24:04.7	62	45.0	26:46.4	63	51:36.3	+8:47.6
DNF	1	Marit Bjørgen	Norway	Did not finish						
DNF	56	Kelime Aydin	Turkey	Did not finish						
DNF	66	Branka Kuzeljević	Serbia and Montenegro	Did not finish						
