= Chizuru =

- Gender: Female

Origin
- Origin: Japanese
- Meaning: Different meanings depending on the kanji used

Chizuru (Japanese: 千鶴, lit. 'thousand cranes') is a feminine Japanese given name. Notable people with the name include:

- Chizuru Arai (新井 千鶴; born 1993), Japanese judoka
- Chizuru Ikewaki (池脇 千鶴; born 1981), Japanese actress
- Chizuru Kotō (古藤 千鶴; born 1982), Japanese volleyball player
- Chizuru Kusaka (日下 千鶴; born 1971), pseudonym of Shizuka Ishikawa, Japanese voice actress
- Chizuru Sasaki (佐々木 千鶴; born 1985), Japanese sports shooter
- Chizuru Soneta (曽根田 千鶴; born 1978), Japanese cross-country skier

== Fictional characters ==
- Chizuru Aizawa (相沢 千鶴), a character in the manga series Squid Girl
- Chizuru Akaba (紅葉 知弦), a character in the light novel series Student Council's Discretion
- Chizuru Hishiro (日代 千鶴), a character in the manga series ReLIFE
- Chizuru Honda (本田 千鶴), a character in the manga series Bokurano
- Chizuru Ikeda (池田 千鶴), a character in the manga series YuruYuri
- Chizuru Kagura (神楽 ちづる), a character in the video game series The King of Fighters
- Chizuru Minamoto (源 千鶴), a character in the light novel series Kanokon
- Chizuru Mizuhara/Chizuru Ichinose (水原 千鶴/一ノ瀬 ちづる), a main character in manga series Rent a Girlfriend
- Chizuru Naba (那波 千鶴), a character in the manga series Negima!
- Chizuru Nanbara (南原ちずる), a character in the anime series Combattler V
- Chizuru Oshima (大島 千づる), a character in the manga series Tonari no Kaibutsu-kun
- Chizuru Sasaki (笹木野 千鶴), a character in Haikyū!!, the position is Wing Spiker and the number is #11
- Chizuru Sakaki (榊 千鶴), a character in the visual novel Muv-Luv
- Chizuru Sawamura (澤村 ちづる), a character in the manga series Inubaka: Crazy for Dogs
- Chizuru Tachibana (橘 千鶴), a character in the visual novel The Fruit of Grisaia
- Chizuru Takano (高野 千鶴), a character in the manga series Tsuredure Children
- Chizuru Tōmi (遠見 千鶴), a character in the anime series Fafner in the Azure
- Chizuru Yoshida (吉田 千鶴), a character in manga series Kimi ni Todoke
- Chizuru Yukimura (雪村 千鶴), protagonist of the video game series Hakuōki
- Hanyuuda Chizuru (羽生田千鶴), Non-player character the video game Genshin Impact
