= Jim Denney =

Jim Denney may refer to:

- Jim Denney (ski jumper born 1957), American former ski jumper
- Jim Denney (ski jumper born 1983), American ski jumper
