= Lanny Barnes =

American biathlete (born 1982)

Personal information
- Nationality: American
- Born: 26 April 1982 (age 44)

Sport
- Sport: Biathlon
Medal record
Women's biathlon
Representing United States
Junior World Championships
Silver medal – second place	2002 Ridnaun	3 × 7.5 km relay
Bronze medal – third place	2002 Ridnaun	12.5 km individual

Lanny Barnes (born April 26, 1982) is an American biathlete who has been competing since 2004.

Her best World Cup finish was 15th in an individual event in Sweden in 2006. Barnes' best finish at the Biathlon World Championships was 39th in the pursuit event at Pyeongchang in 2009. At the 2006 Winter Olympics in Turin, Barnes finished 64th in the individual event. At the 2010 Winter Olympics, she finished 78th in the 7.5 km sprint event.

Barnes was named to the 2014 Winter Olympics on January 12, 2014. Barnes became sick during the qualifying for the 2014 Olympics and initially finished one spot short of making the U.S. team. However, Lanny Barnes's twin sister, 2006 Olympian Tracy Barnes, gave up her own spot on the 2014 team to her sister Lanny.

In 2017, Barnes, who is also an artist, began displaying works through the Art of the Olympians organization.
