= Speed skating at the 2006 Winter Olympics – Men's 1000 metres =

Speed skating at the Olympics

Men's 1000 metres at the XX Olympic Winter Games
- Pictogram for speed skating
- Venue: Oval Lingotto
- Dates: 18 February 2006
- Competitors: 41 from 13 nations
- Winning time: 1:08.89

Medalists
| 1st place, gold medalist(s) | | Shani Davis | United States |
| 2nd place, silver medalist(s) | | Joey Cheek | United States |
| 3rd place, bronze medalist(s) | | Erben Wennemars | Netherlands |

The Men's 1000 m speed skating competition for the 2006 Winter Olympics was held in Turin, Italy.

== Records ==
Prior to this competition, the existing world and Olympic records were as follows.

| World record | Shani Davis (USA) | 1:07.03 | Salt Lake City, United States | 20 November 2005 |
| Olympic record | Gerard van Velde (NED) | 1:07.18 | Salt Lake City, United States | 16 February 2002 |

No new world or Olympic records were set during this competition.

== Results ==
| Rank | Pair | Name | Country | Time | Time behind | Notes |
|---|---|---|---|---|---|---|
| Gold medal | 19 | Shani Davis | United States | 1:08.89 | | |
| Silver medal | 20 | Joey Cheek | United States | 1:09.16 | +0.27 | |
| Bronze medal | 21 | Erben Wennemars | Netherlands | 1:09.32 | +0.43 | |
| 4 | 20 | Lee Kyou-hyuk | South Korea | 1:09.37 | +0.48 | |
| 5 | 21 | Jan Bos | Netherlands | 1:09.42 | +0.53 | |
| 6 | 4 | Chad Hedrick | United States | 1:09.45 | +0.56 | |
| 7 | 16 | Yevgeny Lalenkov | Russia | 1:09.46 | +0.57 | |
| 8 | 18 | Stefan Groothuis | Netherlands | 1:09.57 | +0.68 | |
| 9 | 18 | Casey FitzRandolph | United States | 1:09.59 | +0.70 | |
| 10 | 6 | Dmitry Dorofeyev | Russia | 1:09.74 | +0.85 | |
| 11 | 19 | Jeremy Wotherspoon | Canada | 1:09.76 | +0.87 | |
| 12 | 9 | Beorn Nijenhuis | Netherlands | 1:09.85 | +0.96 | |
| 13 | 4 | Konrad Niedźwiedzki | Poland | 1:09.95 | +1.06 | |
| 14 | 16 | Mikael Flygind Larsen | Norway | 1:10.13 | +1.24 | |
| 15 | 13 | Alexey Proshin | Russia | 1:10.14 | +1.25 | |
| 16 | 7 | François-Olivier Roberge | Canada | 1:10.20 | +1.31 | |
| 17 | 11 | Choi Jae-bong | South Korea | 1:10.23 | +1.34 | |
| 18 | 12 | Petter Andersen | Norway | 1:10.38 | +1.38 | |
| 19 | 17 | Denny Morrison | Canada | 1:10.44 | +1.44 | |
| 20 | 15 | Yusuke Imai | Japan | 1:10.48 | +1.59 | |
| 21 | 15 | Aleksandr Kibalko | Russia | 1:10.50 | +1.61 | |
| 22 | 10 | Lee Kang-seok | South Korea | 1:10.52 | +1.63 | |
| 23 | 14 | Even Wetten | Norway | 1:10.57 | +1.68 | |
| 24 | 17 | Mun Jun | South Korea | 1:10.66 | +1.77 | |
| 25 | 10 | Janne Hänninen | Finland | 1:10.83 | +1.94 | |
| 26 | 2 | Mika Poutala | Finland | 1:11.03 | +2.14 | |
| 27 | 14 | Takaharu Nakajima | Japan | 1:11.10 | +2.21 | |
| 28 | 3 | Takahiro Ushiyama | Japan | 1:11.21 | +2.32 | |
| 29 | 12 | Steven Elm | Canada | 1:11.36 | +2.47 | |
| 30 | 8 | Maurizio Carnino | Italy | 1:11.44 | +2.55 | |
| 31 | 1 | Pekka Koskela | Finland | 1:11.45 | +2.56 | |
| 32 | 11 | Keiichiro Nagashima | Japan | 1:11.78 | +2.89 | |
| 33 | 3 | An Weijiang | China | 1:11.80 | +2.91 | |
| 34 | 13 | Yu Fengtong | China | 1:11.90 | +3.01 | |
| 35 | 7 | Zhang Zhongqi | China | 1:12.29 | +3.40 | |
| 36 | 8 | Aleksandr Zhigin | Kazakhstan | 1:12.36 | +3.47 | |
| 37 | 9 | Risto Rosendahl | Finland | 1:12.60 | +3.71 | |
| 38 | 5 | Lu Zhuo | China | 1:12.69 | +3.80 | |
| – | 5 | Maciej Ustynowicz | Poland | DQ | – | |
| – | 2 | Ermanno Ioriatti | Italy | DQ | – | |
| – | 6 | Erik Zachrisson | Sweden | DQ | – | |
