= Sarah Konrad =

American biathlete

Personal information
- Nationality: American
- Born: August 26, 1967 (age 58) Los Angeles, California, United States

Sport
- Sport: Biathlon, cross-country skiing

Sarah Konrad (born August 26, 1967) is an American former biathlete. She competed in two events at the 2006 Winter Olympics. She also competed in the cross-country skiing at the same Olympics. Konrad was the first woman to represent the United States in two different sports at the same Winter Olympic Games. Since retiring, Konrad has served as a representative for the Athletes Advisory Council of the United States Olympic Committee and the United States Biathlon Association for the International Competition Committee.

== Biography ==
Konrad was born in Los Angeles, California, and attended The Thacher School in Ojai. In 1988, she enrolled on ski program whilst at Dartmouth College. In 1998, Konrad won two golds and a silver at the Masters World Cup event in Lake Placid, New York. The following year, she was ranked as the ninth-best female cross-country skier in the United States. Konrad competed in all the Biathlon World Championships events from 2005 to 2007. She competed in the Olympic trials in Fort Kent, Maine to qualify for the 2006 Winter Olympics. After she retired, she moved back to Laramie, Wyoming to complete a PhD in geology at the University of Wyoming. She was also the oldest female Olympian to represent the United States at the 2006 Winter Games.

In 2014, Konrad, as a glaciologist, was part of an educational video, titled "Science of Snow" for NBC. Konrad undertook an experiment on freezing water and explained how snow relates to Nordic skiing. In 2016, Konrad also worked with the World Anti-Doping Agency, following doping amongst Russian athletes. Konrad then became the United States representative at the 2014 Winter Olympics, to ensure that none of the US team break any Olympic rules.

In 2022, Konrad became a director of US Biathlon.

== Cross-country skiing results ==
All results are sourced from the International Ski Federation (FIS).

=== Olympic Games ===
Year	Age	10 km individual	15 km skiathlon	30 km mass start	Sprint	4 × 5 km relay	Team sprint
2006	38	—	—	32	—	14	—

=== World Championships ===
Year	Age	10 km individual	15 km skiathlon	30 km mass start	Sprint	4 × 5 km relay	Team sprint
2005	37	23	—	—	—	DNF	14
2007	39	55	—	—	—	14	—

=== World Cup ===
==== Season standings ====
Season	Age	Discipline standings			Ski Tour standings
Season	Age	Overall	Distance	Sprint	Tour de Ski
2001	33	NC	—N/a	NC	—N/a
2006	38	100	71	—	—N/a
2007	39	NC	NC	—	—
