= Kati Kovalainen =

Finnish ice hockey player

- Born: 24 January 1975 (age 51) Leppävirta, Finland
- Height: 165 cm (5 ft 5 in)
- Weight: 63 kg (139 lb; 9 st 13 lb)
- Position: Forward
- Shot: Left
- Played for: Imatran Ketterä; KalPa Kuopio; Keravan Shakers; Espoo Blues; IHK Helsinki; SKIF Nizhny Novgorod; HPK Hämeenlinna
- National team: Finland
- Playing career: 1991–2010
Medal record
World Championship
Bronze medal – third place	1997 Canada
Bronze medal – third place	1999 Finland
Bronze medal – third place	2000 Canada
Bronze medal – third place	2004 Canada
Bronze medal – third place	2008 China
Bronze medal – third place	2009 Finland
European Championship
Gold medal – first place	1995 Latvia
Bronze medal – third place	1996 Russia

Katariina Johanna "Kati" Kovalainen (born 24 January 1975) is a Finnish retired ice hockey player and former member of the Finnish national ice hockey team. She represented Finland in the women's ice hockey tournament at the 2006 Winter Olympics in Turin, at nine IIHF Women's World Championships, and at two IIHF European Women Championships.

Her club career spanned nineteen seasons and was played in the Finnish Naisten SM-sarja with the Imatran Ketterä, Kalevan Pallo Naiset, the Keravan Shakers, the Espoo Blues Naiset, and HPK Kiekkonaiset; and in the Russian Women's Hockey League with SKIF Nizhny Novgorod.
