= Branka Kuzeljević =

Serbian cross-country skier (born 1989)

Branka Kuzeljević (Serbian: Бранка Кузељевић) (born July 26, 1989 in Užice, SR Serbia, SFR Yugoslavia) is a Serbian cross-country skier.

She represented Serbia and Montenegro at the 2006 Winter Olympics in Turin, Italy. At only 16 years of age, she was the youngest member of the Serbia and Montenegro Olympic team.
