= Rebecca Dussault =

American cross-country skier (born 1980)

Personal information
- Nationality: United States
- Born: November 14, 1980 (age 45) Gunnison, Colorado, U.S.

Sport
- Sport: Skiing
- Club: Subaru Factory Team

World Cup career
- Seasons: 4 – (1999, 2004–2006)
- Indiv. starts: 14
- Indiv. podiums: 0
- Team starts: 2
- Team podiums: 0
- Overall titles: 0 – (96th in 2004)
- Discipline titles: 0

Rebecca Ann Quinn Dussault (born November 14, 1980) is an American cross-country skier who was born and raised in Gunnison, Colorado. She is married with five children. She participated in the 2006 Winter Olympics and was featured on EWTN's Life on the Rock Catholic TV show for her zeal of her faith and her active Catholic lifestyle.

== Cross-country skiing results ==
All results are sourced from the International Ski Federation (FIS).

=== Olympic Games ===
Year	Age	10 km individual	15 km skiathlon	30 km mass start	Sprint	4 × 5 km relay	Team sprint
2006	25	—	48	43	—	14	—

=== World Championship results ===
Year	Age	5 km	10 km	15 km	Pursuit	30 km	Sprint	4 × 5 km relay	Team sprint
1999	18	70	—N/a	—	50	—	—N/a	14	—N/a
2005	24	—N/a	—	—N/a	49	DNF	41	DNF	—

=== World Cup ===
==== Season standings ====
Season	Age				
Season	Age	Overall	Distance	Long Distance	Sprint
1999	20	NC	—N/a	NC	—
2004	25	96	76	—N/a	NC
2005	26	NC	NC	—N/a	—
2006	27	NC	NC	—N/a	NC
