= Jim Denney (ski jumper born 1983) =

American ski jumper

Jim Denney (born July 5, 1983) is an American ski jumper who competed in the 2006 Winter Olympics. Denney represented the United States team at the age of 22. He is from Minnesota. His father, Jim Denney, is also a former Olympic ski jumper.
