= Lindsey Weier =

American skier (born 1984)

Personal information
- Born: July 2, 1984 (age 42) Saint Paul, Minnesota, United States

Sport
- Sport: Skiing
- Club: Superiorland Ski Club

World Cup career
- Seasons: 3 – (2006, 2008–2009)
- Indiv. starts: 8
- Indiv. podiums: 0
- Team starts: 1
- Team podiums: 0
- Overall titles: 0
- Discipline titles: 0

Lindsey Weier (born July 2, 1984) is an American cross-country skier. She competed in three events at the 2006 Winter Olympics.

== Cross-country skiing results ==
All results are sourced from the International Ski Federation (FIS).

=== Olympic Games ===
Year	Age	10 km individual	15 km skiathlon	30 km mass start	Sprint	4 × 5 km relay	Team sprint
2006	21	59	55	DNF	—	—	—

=== World Championships ===
Year	Age	10 km individual	15 km skiathlon	30 km mass start	Sprint	4 × 5 km relay	Team sprint
2007	22	52	52	—	—	—	—

=== World Cup ===
==== Season standings ====
Season	Age	Discipline standings			Ski Tour standings	
Season	Age	Overall	Distance	Sprint	Tour de Ski	World Cup Final
2006	21	NC	NC	NC	—N/a	—N/a
2008	23	NC	NC	NC	—	—
2009	24	NC	NC	NC	—	—
