= Lindsay Williams (cross-country skier) =

American skier (born 1984)

Personal information
- Born: June 16, 1984 (age 42) Saint Paul, Minnesota, United States

Sport
- Sport: Skiing
- Club: Northern Michigan Wildcats

World Cup career
- Seasons: 4 – (2005–2006, 2008–2009)
- Indiv. starts: 11
- Indiv. podiums: 0
- Team starts: 2
- Team podiums: 0
- Overall titles: 0
- Discipline titles: 0

Lindsay Williams (born June 16, 1984) is an American cross-country skier. She competed in two events at the 2006 Winter Olympics.

== Cross-country skiing results ==
All results are sourced from the International Ski Federation (FIS).

=== Olympic Games ===
Year	Age	10 km individual	15 km skiathlon	30 km mass start	Sprint	4 × 5 km relay	Team sprint
2006	21	—	62	—	38	—	—

=== World Cup ===
==== Season standings ====
Season	Age	Discipline standings			Ski Tour standings	
Season	Age	Overall	Distance	Sprint	Tour de Ski	World Cup Final
2005	20	NC	NC	—	—N/a	—N/a
2006	21	NC	NC	NC	—N/a	—N/a
2008	23	NC	NC	NC	—	—
2009	24	NC	—	NC	—	—
