= Abby Larson =

American cross-country skier (born 1979)

Personal information
- Born: April 19, 1979 (age 47) Saint Paul, Minnesota, United States

Sport
- Sport: Skiing
- Club: Subaru Factory Team

World Cup career
- Seasons: 1 – (2006)
- Indiv. starts: 5
- Indiv. podiums: 0
- Team starts: 0
- Overall titles: 0 – (125th in 2006)
- Discipline titles: 0

Abigail (Abby) Larson (born April 19, 1979) is an American former cross-country skier. She competed in three events at the 2006 Winter Olympics.

== Cross-country skiing results ==
All results are sourced from the International Ski Federation (FIS).

=== Olympic Games ===
Year	Age	10 km individual	15 km skiathlon	30 km mass start	Sprint	4 × 5 km relay	Team sprint
2006	26	57	56	47	—	—	—

=== World Cup ===
==== Season standings ====
Season	Age			
Season	Age	Overall	Distance	Sprint
2006	26	125	93	NC
