= Kristin King =

American ice hockey player (born 1979)

- Born: July 21, 1979 (age 47) Piqua, Ohio, U.S.
- Height: 5 ft 4 in (163 cm)
- Weight: 135 lb (61 kg; 9 st 9 lb)
- Position: Forward
- ECAC NWHL team: Dartmouth Big Green; Oakville Ice
- National team: United States
- Playing career: 1997–2007
Medal record
Representing United States
Women's ice hockey
Olympic Games
Bronze medal – third place	2006 Turin	Tournament
IIHF World Women's Championships
Gold medal – first place	2005 Sweden	Tournament
Silver medal – second place	2004 Canada	Tournament
Silver medal – second place	2007 Canada	Tournament

Kristin T. King (born July 21, 1979) in Piqua, Ohio is an American ice hockey player. She won a bronze medal at the 2006 Winter Olympics. She graduated from Dartmouth College in 2002.
