= Lyndsay Wall =

American ice hockey player (born 1985)

- Born: May 12, 1985 (age 41) Visalia, California, U.S.
- Height: 5 ft 8 in (173 cm)
- Weight: 143 lb (65 kg; 10 st 3 lb)
- Position: Defence
- Shot: Right
- Played for: Minnesota Golden Gophers
- National team: United States
- Playing career: 2001–2006
Medal record
Representing United States
Women's ice hockey
Olympic Games
Silver medal – second place	2002 Salt Lake City	Tournament
Bronze medal – third place	2006 Turin	Tournament
IIHF World Women's Championships
Gold medal – first place	2005 Sweden	Tournament

Lyndsay Cheyenne Wall (born May 12, 1985) is an American ice hockey player. She won a silver medal at the 2002 Winter Olympics and a bronze medal at the 2006 Winter Olympics.

She graduated from Churchville-Chili High School in the Rochester, New York area in 2003.
