= Chanda Gunn =

American ice hockey player (born 1980)

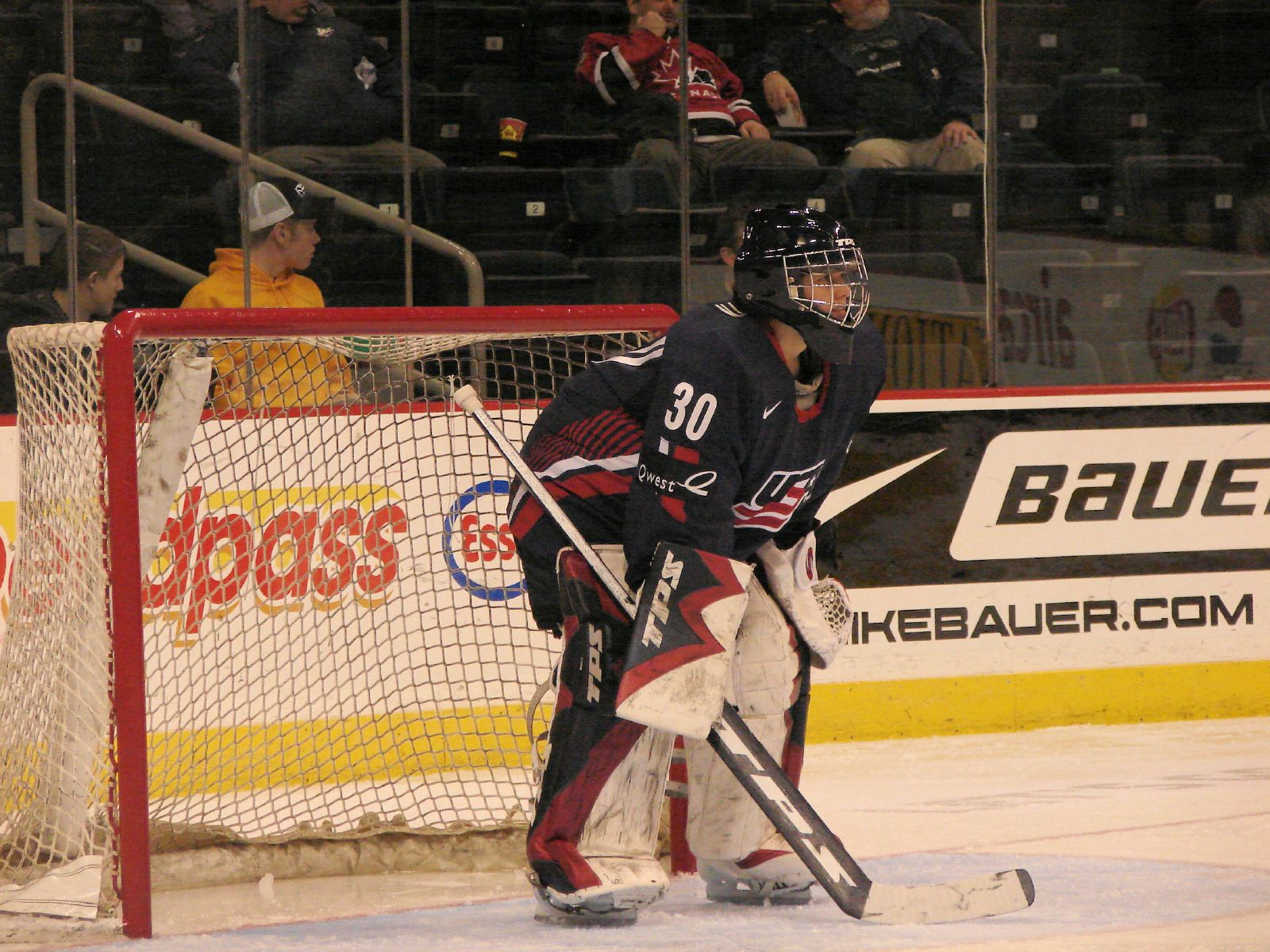
- Born: January 27, 1980 (age 46) Huntington Beach, CA, USA
- Height: 5 ft 7 in (170 cm)
- Weight: 140 lb (64 kg; 10 st 0 lb)
- Position: Goaltender
- Caught: Left
- WCHA ECAC9 team: Wisconsin; Northeastern
- Playing career: 2004–2007
Medal record
Representing United States
Women's ice hockey
Olympic Games
Bronze medal – third place	2006 Turin	Tournament
IIHF World Women's Championships
Gold medal – first place	2005 Sweden	Tournament
Silver medal – second place	2004 Canada	Tournament
Silver medal – second place	2007 Canada	Tournament

Chanda Leigh Gunn (born January 27, 1980, in Huntington Beach, California) is a retired American ice hockey goaltender. She won a bronze medal at the 2006 Winter Olympics. At the games in Turin, she played close to 250 minutes and had 50 saves with a save percentage of 89.3%.

== Northeastern ==
In the 2003–04 season, Chanda Gunn in her senior season led the Huskies to eight wins. In doing so, she broke two school records: registering 56 saves in a game and twice recording 23 saves in one period. In addition, she finished the season ranked first nationally in save percentage, with a .940 mark, and tenth in the nation with a 1.94 goals-against average. During the season, she was recognized twice as Hockey East Player of the Month. She ranked first in the conference in save percentage (.937) and third in goals-against average with a 2.01 GAA. During her career, Gunn was a finalist for College Hockey's Humanitarian Award, presented annually to college hockey's finest citizen, in 2003 and 2004.

In 2004, Gunn was awarded the Honda Inspiration Award which is given to a collegiate athlete "who has overcome hardship and was able to return to play at the collegiate level". She overcame epilepsy and rebounded to become an All-American hockey goalie.

Since the 2007–2008 season, Gunn is an assistant coach at Northeastern University under head coach Laura Schuler. The two-time All-America goaltender is coaching while continuing to pursue her international hockey career.

== Personal life ==
Gunn has epilepsy and is in therapy with Keppra. She is a spokesperson for Epilepsy Therapy Project. Her wife, Susan Linn, is the CEO of the Epilepsy Foundation of New England.

=== International ===
Year	Team	Event	Result	GP	W	L	T/OT	MIN	GA	SO	GAA	SV%
2006	United States	OG	3rd place, bronze medalist(s)	4	3	1	0	250:00	6	1	1.44	0.893

== Awards and honors ==
- 2004 Honda Inspiration Award
- 2004 Finalist for Patty Kazmaier Award
- 2003-04 Hockey East Three Stars Award
- 2003-04 Hockey East Player of the Year
- Top 10 Finalist for the 2002 Patty Kazmaier Memorial Awards
- Top 10 Finalist for the 2003 Patty Kazmaier Memorial Awards
- College Hockey's Humanitarian Award Winner (2003-2004 season)
- Finalist for College Hockey's Humanitarian Award (2003)
- Finalist for College Hockey's Humanitarian Award (2002)
- Hockey East 10th Anniversary Team selection
