= Tracy Barnes (biathlete) =

American biathlete (born 1982)

Personal information
- Born: April 26, 1982 (age 44) Durango, Colorado, United States

Sport
- Sport: Biathlon
Medal record
Women's biathlon
Representing United States
Junior World Championships
Silver medal – second place	2002 Ridnaun	3 × 7.5 km relay

Tracy Barnes (born April 26, 1982) is an American biathlete. She competed in three events at the 2006 Winter Olympics.
