= Maija Hassinen-Sullanmaa =

Finnish ice hockey goaltender and coach (born 1984)

- Born: 2 January 1984 (age 42) Hämeenlinna, Finland
- Height: 161 cm (5 ft 3 in)
- Weight: 56 kg (123 lb; 8 st 11 lb)
- Position: Goaltender
- Caught: Left
- Played for: HPK Hämeenlinna; Ilves Tampere
- Current coach: HPK Hämeenlinna
- National team: Finland
- Playing career: 2003–2015
- Coaching career: 2015–present
Medal record
World Championship
| Bronze medal – third place | 2011 Switzerland |
| Bronze medal – third place | 2009 Finland |
| Bronze medal – third place | 2008 China |

Maija Johanna Hassinen-Sullanmaa née Hassinen (born 2 January 1984) is a Finnish retired ice hockey goaltender and the current goaltending coach and team manager of HPK Kiekkonaiset in the Auroraliiga.

As a member of the Finnish national team, she participated in the women's ice hockey tournament at the 2006 Winter Olympics in Turin and in the IIHF Women's World Championship in 2007, 2008, 2009, and 2011, winning bronze medals at the tournaments in 2008, 2009, and 2011.

== Playing career ==
Hassinen-Sullanmaa's fourteen-season senior club career was played in the Naisten SM-sarja (renamed Naisten Liiga in 2017 and Auroraliiga in 2024) with HPK Hämeenlinna and the Ilves Tampere. She won the Finnish Championship twice, in 2005–06 with Ilves and in 2010–11 with HPK. Hassinen-Sullanmaa is one of the most highly decorated goaltenders in Auroraliiga history: she was awarded the Tuula Puputti Award as Goaltender of the Year in 2005–06, 2007–08, 2008–09, and 2010–11 – the all-time most wins of the trophy; was selected to the All-Star Team in 2007–08, 2009–10, and 2010–11; and received the Karoliina Rantamäki Award as MVP of the Playoffs in 2005–06.

== Personal life ==
Hassinen-Sullanmaa is married to Finnish curler Jani Sullanmaa.

== Career statistics ==
=== International ===
| Year | Team | Event | Result | GP | W | L | OT | MIN | SA | GA | SO | GAA | SV% |
|---|---|---|---|---|---|---|---|---|---|---|---|---|---|
| 2006 | Finland | OG | 4th | 4 | 1 | 2 | 0 | 195:17 | 88 | 11 | 0 | 3.38 | .875 |
| 2007 | Finland | WW | 4th | 0 | – | – | – | – | | – | – | – | – |
| 2008 | Finland | WW | 3rd place, bronze medalist(s) | 1 | 1 | 0 | 0 | 63:00 | 12 | 2 | 0 | .833 | 1.90 |
| 2009 | Finland | WW | 3rd place, bronze medalist(s) | 3 | 1 | 1 | 0 | 129:12 | 46 | 9 | 0 | .804 | 4.18 |
| 2011 | Finland | WW | 3rd place, bronze medalist(s) | 1 | 1 | 0 | 0 | 60:00 | 15 | 3 | 0 | .800 | 3.00 |
| Senior totals | | | | 9 | 4 | 3 | 0 | 447:29 | 161 | 25 | 0 | .845 | 3.34 |
