= Chizuru Soneta =

Japanese cross-country skier (born 1978)

Personal information
- Nationality: Japanese
- Born: 15 February 1978 (age 47) Mogami, Japan

Sport
- Sport: Cross-country skiing

Chizuru Soneta (曽根田 千鶴, Soneta Chizuru; born 15 February 1978) is a Japanese cross-country skier, who competed in two events at the 2006 Winter Olympics.
