= 2004–05 FIS Cross-Country World Cup =

Cross-country skiing competition

Discipline	Men	Women
Overall	(Germany) Axel Teichmann	(Norway) Marit Bjørgen
Distance	(Germany) Axel Teichmann	(Norway) Marit Bjørgen
Sprint	(Norway) Tor Arne Hetland	(Norway) Marit Bjørgen
Nations Cup	Norway	Norway
- Nations Cup Overall: Norway

Competition
Locations	16 venues	16 venues
Individual	20 events	20 events
Relay/Team	7 events	7 events
Cancelled	1 event	1 event

The 2004–05 FIS Cross-Country World Cup was the 24th official World Cup season in cross-country skiing for men and women. The season began in Düsseldorf, Germany on 23 October 2004 and was concluded in Falun, Sweden on 20 March 2005. The overall winners were Marit Bjørgen and Axel Teichmann.

== Calendar ==
=== Men ===
WC	Venue	Discipline	Date	Winner	Second	Third
1	(Germany) Düsseldorf	Sprint F	23 October 2004	(Sweden) Peter Larsson	(Norway) Tor-Arne Hetland	(Italy) Cristian Zorzi
2	(Sweden) Gällivare	15 km C	20 November 2004	(Germany) Axel Teichmann	(Germany) René Sommerfeldt	(Russia) Vasily Rochev
3	(Finland) Ruka	15 km F	27 November 2004	(France) Vincent Vittoz	(Germany) Axel Teichmann	(Italy) Giorgio Di Centa
4	(Finland) Ruka	15 km C	28 November 2004	(Germany) Axel Teichmann	(Russia) Vasily Rochev	(Germany) René Sommerfeldt
5	(Switzerland) Bern	Sprint F	4 December 2004	(Norway) Tor-Arne Hetland	(Sweden) Thobias Fredriksson	(Norway) Johan Kjølstad
6	(Italy) Val di Fiemme	30 km Skiathlon	11 December 2004	(Germany) Axel Teichmann	(Germany) Jens Filbrich	(France) Vincent Vittoz
7	(Italy) Asiago	Sprint C	14 December 2004	(Norway) Jens Arne Svartedal	(Norway) Tor-Arne Hetland	(Sweden) Björn Lind
8	(Austria) Ramsau	30 km F, mass start	18 December 2004	(France) Vincent Vittoz	(Sweden) Anders Södergren	(Germany) Axel Teichmann
9	(Estonia) Otepää	15 km C	8 January 2005	(Estonia) Andrus Veerpalu	(Norway) Frode Estil	(Estonia) Jaak Mae
	(Estonia) Otepää	Sprint C	9 January 2005	Cancelled (rescheduled to Lahti 5 March)		
10	(Czech Republic) Nové Město	15 km F	15 January 2005	(France) Vincent Vittoz	(Austria) Christian Hoffmann	(Germany) Tobias Angerer
11	(Czech Republic) Nové Město	Sprint F	16 January 2005	(Norway) Johan Kjølstad	(Italy) Freddy Schwienbacher	(Sweden) Björn Lind
12	(Italy) Pragelato	30 km Skiathlon	22 January 2005	(Czech Republic) Lukáš Bauer	(Sweden) Mathias Fredriksson	(Norway) Kristen Skjeldal
13	(Germany) Reit im Winkl	15 km F	12 February 2005	(Slovakia) Martin Bajčičák	(Italy) Giorgio Di Centa	(Austria) Christian Hoffmann
14	(Germany) Reit im Winkl	Sprint C	13 February 2005	(Norway) Eldar Rønning	(Norway) Odd-Bjørn Hjelmeset	(Poland) Janusz Krężelok
FIS Nordic World Ski Championships 2005 (16–27 February)
15	(Finland) Lahti	Sprint C	5 March 2005	(Norway) Børre Næss	(Norway) Tor-Arne Hetland	(Norway) Eldar Rønning
16	(Finland) Lahti	15 km F	6 March 2005	(Czech Republic) Lukáš Bauer	(Austria) Christian Hoffmann	(Italy) Thomas Moriggl
17	(Norway) Drammen	Sprint C	9 March 2005	(Norway) Tor-Arne Hetland	(Norway) Eldar Rønning	(Norway) Børre Næss
18	(Norway) Oslo	50 km C	12 March 2005	(Estonia) Andrus Veerpalu	(Germany) Jens Filbrich	(Norway) Odd-Bjørn Hjelmeset
19	(Sweden) Gothenburg	Sprint F	16. March 2005	(Norway) Trond Iversen	(Finland) Keijo Kurttila	(Norway) Ola Vigen Hattestad
20	(Sweden) Falun	30 km Skiathlon	19 March 2005	(Russia) Yevgeny Dementyev	(Germany) Tobias Angerer	(Slovakia) Martin Bajčičák

=== Women ===
WC	Venue	Discipline	Date	Winner	Second	Third
1	(Germany) Düsseldorf	Sprint F	23 oktober 2004	(Norway) Marit Bjørgen	(Sweden) Anna Dahlberg	(Italy) Gabriella Paruzzi
2	(Sweden) Gällivare	10 km C	20 November 2004	(Norway) Marit Bjørgen	(Estonia) Kristina Šmigun	(Finland) Virpi Kuitunen
3	(Finland) Ruka	10 km F	26 November 2004	(Czech Republic) Kateřina Neumannová	(Estonia) Kristina Šmigun	(Russia) Natalya Baranova-Masalkina
4	(Finland) Ruka	10 km C	28 November 2004	(Estonia) Kristina Šmigun	(Czech Republic) Kateřina Neumannová	(Norway) Marit Bjørgen
5	(Switzerland) Bern	Sprint F	4 December 2004	(Norway) Marit Bjørgen	(Germany) Claudia Künzel	(Norway) Ella Gjømle
6	(Italy) Val di Fiemme	15 km Skiathlon	11 December 2004	(Norway) Marit Bjørgen	(Estonia) Kristina Šmigun	(Italy) Gabriella Paruzzi
7	(Italy) Asiago	Sprint C	14 December 2004	(Norway) Marit Bjørgen	(Finland) Virpi Kuitunen	(Norway) Ella Gjømle
8	(Austria) Ramsau	15 km F, mass start	18 December 2004	(Estonia) Kristina Šmigun	(Norway) Kristin Størmer Steira	(Russia) Yevgeniya Medvedeva-Abruzova
9	(Estonia) Otepää	10 km C	8 January 2005	(Norway) Marit Bjørgen	(Norway) Hilde Gjermundshaug Pedersen	(Czech Republic) Kateřina Neumannová
	(Estonia) Otepää	Sprint C	9 January 2005	Cancelled (Rescheduled to Lahti 5 March)		
10	(Czech Republic) Nové Město	10 km F	15 January 2005	(Czech Republic) Kateřina Neumannová	(Norway) Marit Bjørgen	(Russia) Yuliya Chepalova
11	(Czech Republic) Nové Město	Sprint F	16 January 2005	(Norway) Marit Bjørgen	(Finland) Pirjo Manninen	(Germany) Claudia Künzel
12	(Italy) Pragelato	15 km Skiathlon	22 January 2005	(Norway) Kristin Størmer Steira	(Czech Republic) Kateřina Neumannová	(Germany) Claudia Künzel
13	(Germany) Reit im Winkl	10 km F	12 February 2005	(Russia) Yevgeniya Medvedeva-Abruzova	(Russia) Olga Zavyalova	(Russia) Yuliya Chepalova
14	(Germany) Reit im Winkl	Sprint C	13 February 2005	(Finland) Virpi Kuitunen	(Norway) Marit Bjørgen	(Sweden) Anna Dahlberg
FIS Nordic World Ski Championships 2005 (16–27 February)
15	(Finland) Lahti	Sprint C	5 March 2005	(Sweden) Lina Andersson	(Finland) Kirsi Välimaa	(Finland) Virpi Kuitunen
16	(Finland) Lahti	10 km F	6 March 2005	(Russia) Yuliya Chepalova	(Czech Republic) Kateřina Neumannová	(France) Karine Philippot
17	(Norway) Drammen	Sprint C	9 March 2005	(Finland) Virpi Kuitunen	(Sweden) Lina Andersson	(Sweden) Anna Dahlberg
18	(Norway) Oslo	30 km C	12 March 2005	(Norway) Marit Bjørgen	(Czech Republic) Kateřina Neumannová	(Finland) Virpi Kuitunen
19	(Sweden) Gothenburg	Sprint F	16 March 2005	(Norway) Marit Bjørgen	(Finland) Aino-Kaisa Saarinen	(Finland) Virpi Kuitunen
20	(Sweden) Falun	15 km Skiathlon	19 March 2005	(Norway) Marit Bjørgen	(Czech Republic) Kateřina Neumannová	(Russia) Yuliya Chepalova

=== Men's team ===
WC	Date	Place	Discipline	Winner	Second	Third	Ref.
1	24 October 2004	(Germany) Düsseldorf	Team Sprint F	Norway Håvard Bjerkeli; Tor Arne Hetland	Germany Tobias Angerer; Axel Teichmann	Germany III Toni Lang; Andreas Stitzl	
2	21 November 2004	(Sweden) Gällivare	4 × 10 km relay C/F	Germany Jens Filbrich; Tobias Angerer; René Sommerfeldt; Axel Teichmann	Italy Giorgio Di Centa; Fulvio Valbusa; Pietro Piller Cottrer; Cristian Zorzi	France Christophe Perrillat; Vincent Vittoz; Emmanuel Jonnier; Benoit Chauvet	
3	5 December 2004	(Switzerland) Bern	Team Sprint F	Russia Ivan Alypov; Vasily Rochev	Norway Jens Arne Svartedal; Tor Arne Hetland	Italy Renato Pasini; Cristian Zorzi	
4	12 December 2004	(Italy) Val di Fiemme	4 × 10 km relay C/F	Norway Jens Arne Svartedal; Odd-Bjørn Hjelmeset; Frode Estil; Tore Ruud Hofstad	Italy Giorgio Di Centa; Fulvio Valbusa; Pietro Piller Cottrer; Cristian Zorzi	France Christophe Perrillat; Vincent Vittoz; Emmanuel Jonnier; Alexandre Rousselet	
5	15 December 2004	(Italy) Asiago	Team Sprint C	Norway Tor Arne Hetland; Jens Arne Svartedal	Russia Nikolay Pankratov; Vasily Rochev	Norway II Trond Iversen; Børre Næss	
6	23 January 2005	(Italy) Pragelato	Team Sprint C	Germany Jens Filbrich; Axel Teichmann	Sweden Thobias Fredriksson; Björn Lind	Germany II René Sommerfeldt; Andreas Schlütter	
7	20 March 2005	(Sweden) Falun	4 × 10 km relay C/F	Norway Jens Arne Svartedal; Odd-Bjørn Hjelmeset; Kristen Skjeldal; Tore Ruud Hofstad	Italy Roland Clara; Valerio Checchi; Pietro Piller Cottrer; Giorgio Di Centa	Sweden Thobias Fredriksson; Niklas Karlsson; Anders Södergren; Mathias Fredriksson	

=== Women's team ===
WC	Date	Place	Discipline	Winner	Second	Third	Ref.
1	24 October 2004	(Germany) Düsseldorf	Team Sprint F	Norway Hilde Gjermundshaug Pedersen; Marit Bjørgen	Germany II Manuela Henkel; Evi Sachenbacher-Stehle	Italy Arianna Follis; Gabriella Paruzzi	
2	21 November 2004	(Sweden) Gällivare	4 × 5 km relay C/F	Norway Kine Beate Bjørnås; Vibeke Skofterud; Hilde Gjermundshaug Pedersen; Marit Bjørgen	Finland Kirsi Välimaa; Virpi Kuitunen; Aino-Kaisa Saarinen; Riitta-Liisa Roponen	Germany Stefanie Böhler; Evi Sachenbacher-Stehle; Anke Reschwamm Schulze; Claudia Künzel	
3	5 December 2004	(Switzerland) Bern	Team Sprint F	Norway Ella Gjømle; Marit Bjørgen	Germany Stefanie Böhler; Claudia Künzel	Italy Arianna Follis; Gabriella Paruzzi	
4	12 December 2004	(Italy) Val di Fiemme	4 × 5 km relay C/F	Russia Larisa Kurkina; Natalya Baranova-Masalkina; Yevgeniya Medvedeva-Abruzova; Yuliya Chepalova	Germany Manuela Henkel; Claudia Künzel; Stefanie Böhler; Evi Sachenbacher-Stehle	Norway Kine Beate Bjørnås; Vibeke Skofterud; Hilde Gjermundshaug Pedersen; Marit Bjørgen	
5	15 December 2004	(Italy) Asiago	Team Sprint C	Norway Ella Gjømle; Marit Bjørgen	Finland Aino-Kaisa Saarinen; Virpi Kuitunen	Sweden Elin Ek; Anna Dahlberg	
6	23 January 2005	(Italy) Pragelato	Team Sprint C	Germany Viola Bauer; Claudia Künzel	Sweden Emelie Öhrstig; Anna Dahlberg	Finland Aino-Kaisa Saarinen; Pirjo Manninen	
7	20 March 2005	(Sweden) Falun	4 × 5 km relay C/F	Finland Aino-Kaisa Saarinen; Kirsi Välimaa; Riitta-Liisa Roponen; Virpi Kuitunen	Norway Kine Beate Bjørnås; Hilde Gjermundshaug Pedersen; Kristin Mürer Stemland; Marit Bjørgen	Russia Larisa Kurkina; Natalya Baranova-Masalkina; Yevgeniya Medvedeva-Abruzova; Yuliya Chepalova	

== Men's standings ==
=== Overall ===
Rank	after all 20 events	Points
1	(Germany) Axel Teichmann	584
2	(France) Vincent Vittoz	516
3	(Norway) Tor Arne Hetland	512
4	(Germany) Tobias Angerer	439
5	(Germany) René Sommerfeldt	374
6	(Sweden) Mathias Fredriksson	374
7	(Norway) Jens Arne Svartedal	361
8	(Italy) Giorgio Di Centa	354
9	(Russia) Yevgeny Dementyev	351
10	(Norway) Eldar Rønning	320

=== Distance ===
Rank		Points
1	(Germany) Axel Teichmann	552
2	(France) Vincent Vittoz	506
3	(Germany) Tobias Angerer	402
4	(Germany) René Sommerfeldt	374
5	(Italy) Giorgio Di Centa	354
6	(Russia) Yevgeny Dementyev	351
7	(Sweden) Mathias Fredriksson	350
8	(Germany) Jens Filbrich	320
9	(Czech Republic) Lukáš Bauer	319
10	(Estonia) Andrus Veerpalu	302

=== Sprint ===
Rank		Points
1	(Norway) Tor Arne Hetland	564
2	(Norway) Eldar Rønning	327
3	(Norway) Trond Iversen	281
4	(Sweden) Thobias Fredriksson	267
5	(Norway) Børre Næss	265
6	(Sweden) Björn Lind	256
7	(Norway) Johan Kjølstad	251
8	(Norway) Jens Arne Svartedal	234
9	(Finland) Keijo Kurttila	171
10	(Estonia) Anti Saarepuu	158

== Women's standings ==
=== Overall ===
Rank	after all 20 events	Points
1	(Norway) Marit Bjørgen	1320
2	(Czech Republic) Kateřina Neumannová	751
3	(Finland) Virpi Kuitunen	726
4	(Estonia) Kristina Šmigun	643
5	(Germany) Claudia Nystad	613
6	(Norway) Hilde Gjermundshaug Pedersen	552
7	(Russia) Yuliya Chepalova	530
8	(Finland) Aino-Kaisa Saarinen	484
9	(Russia) Natalya Baranova-Masalkina	431
10	(Italy) Gabriella Paruzzi	397

=== Distance ===
Rank		Points
1	(Norway) Marit Bjørgen	740
2	(Czech Republic) Kateřina Neumannová	727
3	(Estonia) Kristina Šmigun	641
4	(Russia) Yuliya Chepalova	521
5	(Russia) Natalya Baranova-Masalkina	397
6	(Norway) Hilde Gjermundshaug Pedersen	387
7	(Germany) Claudia Nystad	343
8	(Finland) Virpi Kuitunen	313
9	(Norway) Kristin Størmer Steira	311
10	(Italy) Gabriella Paruzzi	305

=== Sprint ===
Rank		Points
1	(Norway) Marit Bjørgen	625
2	(Finland) Virpi Kuitunen	415
3	(Sweden) Anna Dahlberg	385
4	(Finland) Aino-Kaisa Saarinen	290
5	(Germany) Claudia Nystad	270
6	(Sweden) Lina Andersson	236
7	(Finland) Pirjo Muranen	232
8	(Norway) Ella Gjømle	218
9	(Sweden) Emelie Öhrstig	218
10	(Norway) Hilde Gjermundshaug Pedersen	165

== Nations Cup ==
=== Overall ===
Rank	Nation	Points
1	Norway	8448
2	Germany	4881
3	Russia	4541
4	Finland	3902
5	Sweden	3875
6	Italy	3811
7	Estonia	1849
8	France	1793
9	Czech Republic	1524
10	Switzerland	901

=== Men ===
Rank	Nation	Points
1	Norway	4488
2	Germany	2712
3	Sweden	2429
4	Italy	2369
5	Russia	1779
6	France	1240
7	Estonia	1128
8	Finland	805
9	Czech Republic	704
10	Switzerland	467

=== Women ===
Rank	Nation	Points
1	Norway	3960
2	Finland	3097
3	Russia	2762
4	Germany	2169
5	Sweden	1446
6	Italy	1442
7	Czech Republic	820
8	Estonia	721
9	France	553
10	Canada	530

== Achievements ==
Victories in this World Cup (all-time number of victories as of 2004–05 season in parentheses)

Men

- Axel Teichmann (GER), 3 (5) first places
- Vincent Vittoz (FRA), 3 (4) first places
- Tor Arne Hetland (NOR), 2 (8) first places
- Andrus Veerpalu (EST), 2 (6) first places
- Lukáš Bauer (CZE), 2 (3) first places
- Jens Arne Svartedal (NOR), 1 (7) first place
- Peter Larsson (SWE), 1 (3) first place
- Trond Iversen (NOR), 1 (2) first place
- Johan Kjølstad (NOR), 1 (1) first place
- Martin Bajčičák (SVK), 1 (1) first place
- Eldar Rønning (NOR), 1 (1) first place
- Børre Næss (NOR), 1 (1) first place
- Yevgeny Dementyev (RUS), 1 (1) first place

Women

- Marit Bjørgen (NOR), 10 (20) first places
- Kristina Šmigun (EST), 2 (15) first places
- Kateřina Neumannová (CZE), 2 (13) first places
- Virpi Kuitunen (FIN), 2 (3) first places
- Yuliya Chepalova (RUS), 1 (16) first place
- Kristin Størmer Steira (NOR), 1 (1) first place
- Yevgeniya Medvedeva-Abruzova (RUS), 1 (1) first place
- Lina Andersson (SWE), 1 (1) first place
