= Therese Johaug =

Norwegian cross-country skier

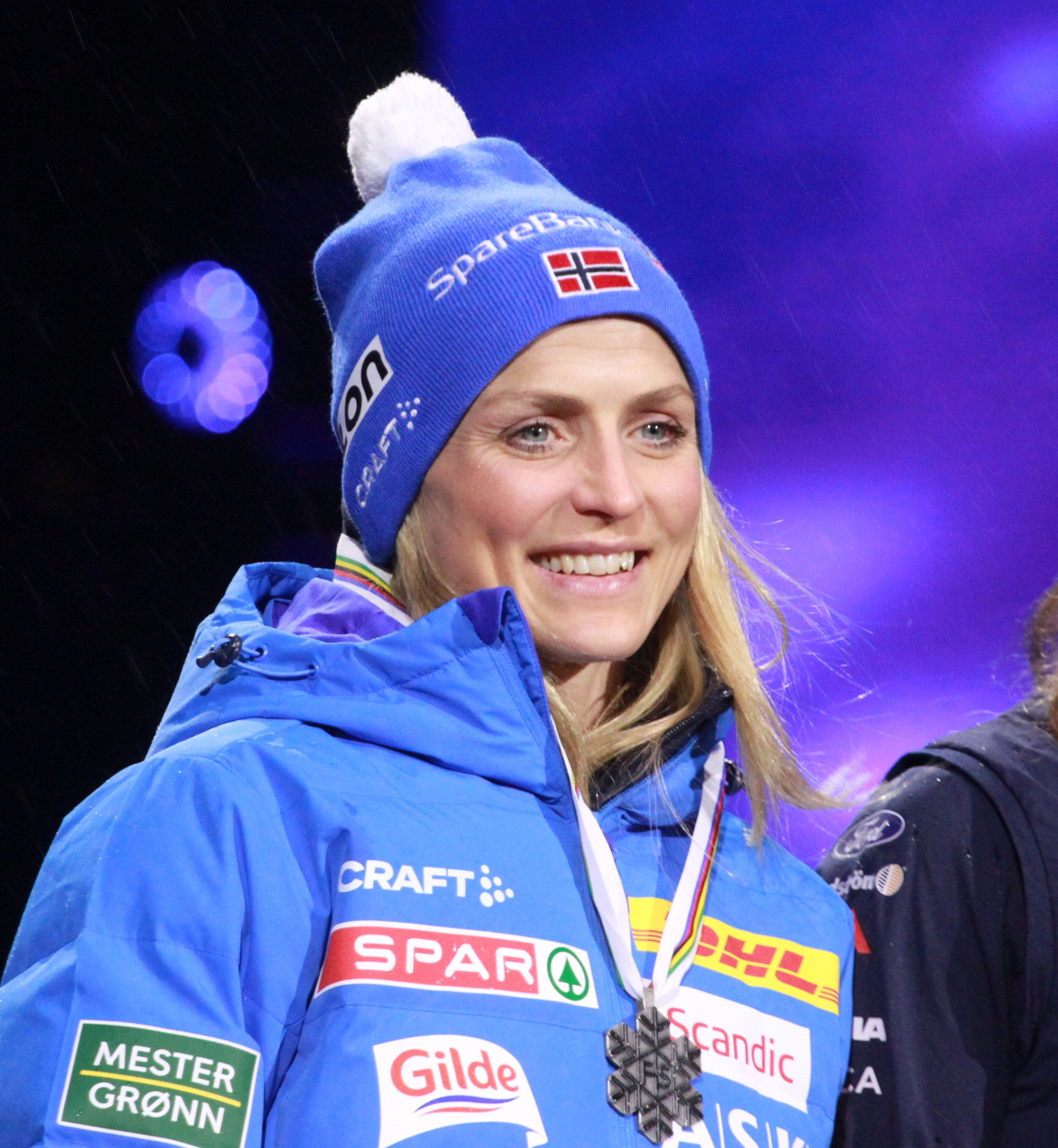
- Johaug in 2025

Personal information
- Nationality: Norway
- Born: 25 June 1988 (age 38) Os Municipality, Norway
- Height: 1.61 m (5 ft 3 in)
- Spouse: Nils Jakob Hoff (2023–present)

Sport
- Sport: Skiing
- Club: IL Nansen

World Cup career
- Seasons: 15 – (2007–2016, 2019–2022, 2025)
- Indiv. starts: 261
- Indiv. podiums: 160
- Indiv. wins: 89
- Team starts: 24
- Team podiums: 22
- Team wins: 18
- Overall titles: 3 – (2014, 2016, 2020)
- Discipline titles: 5 – (5 DI)
Medal record
Women's cross-country skiing
Representing Norway
International nordic ski competitions
Event	1st	2nd	3rd
Olympic Games	4	1	1
World Championships	14	5	4
Total	18	6	5
Olympic Games
Gold medal – first place	2010 Vancouver	4 × 5 km relay
Gold medal – first place	2022 Beijing	15 km skiathlon
Gold medal – first place	2022 Beijing	30 km freestyle
Gold medal – first place	2022 Beijing	10 km classical
Silver medal – second place	2014 Sochi	30 km freestyle
Bronze medal – third place	2014 Sochi	10 km classical
World Championships
Gold medal – first place	2011 Oslo	4 × 5 km relay
Gold medal – first place	2011 Oslo	30 km freestyle
Gold medal – first place	2013 Val di Fiemme	10 km freestyle
Gold medal – first place	2013 Val di Fiemme	4 × 5 km relay
Gold medal – first place	2015 Falun	15 km skiathlon
Gold medal – first place	2015 Falun	30 km classical
Gold medal – first place	2015 Falun	4 × 5 km relay
Gold medal – first place	2019 Seefeld	15 km skiathlon
Gold medal – first place	2019 Seefeld	10 km classical
Gold medal – first place	2019 Seefeld	30 km freestyle
Gold medal – first place	2021 Oberstdorf	15 km skiathlon
Gold medal – first place	2021 Oberstdorf	10 km freestyle
Gold medal – first place	2021 Oberstdorf	30 km classical
Gold medal – first place	2021 Oberstdorf	4 × 5 km relay
Silver medal – second place	2013 Val di Fiemme	15 km skiathlon
Silver medal – second place	2019 Seefeld	4 × 5 km relay
Silver medal – second place	2025 Trondheim	20 km skiathlon
Silver medal – second place	2025 Trondheim	10 km classical
Silver medal – second place	2025 Trondheim	4 x 7.5 km relay
Bronze medal – third place	2007 Sapporo	30 km classical
Bronze medal – third place	2011 Oslo	15 km skiathlon
Bronze medal – third place	2013 Val di Fiemme	30 km classical
Bronze medal – third place	2025 Trondheim	50 km freestyle
Junior World Championships
Gold medal – first place	2008 Mals	5 km classical
Gold medal – first place	2008 Mals	10 km freestyle
Gold medal – first place	2008 Mals	4 × 3.33 km relay
Bronze medal – third place	2007 Tarvisio	10 km pursuit
- Updated on 26 May 2025

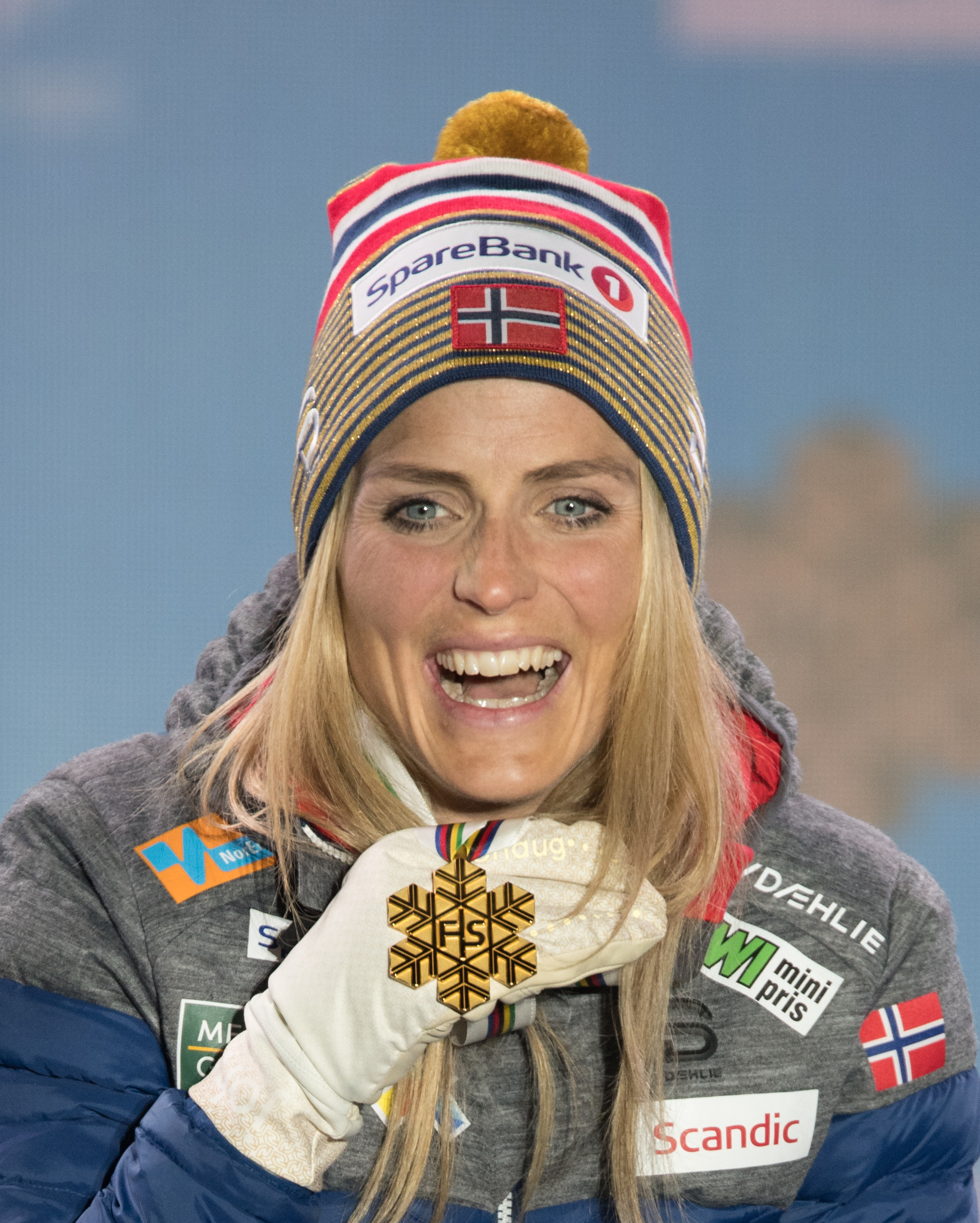
Johaug with the gold medal for her victory in the 10 km at the 2019 World Championships in Seefeld.

Therese Johaug (born 25 June 1988) is a Norwegian former cross-country skier and long-distance runner from the village of Dalsbygda in Os Municipality. In World Ski Championships she won ten individual gold medals along with four gold medals in relays, and she is a four-time Olympic gold medallist.

== Career ==
After skiing some domestic races in the 2006 season, Johaug took part at the Norwegian Championships in 2007, winning a bronze at the 7.5 km + 7.5 km double pursuit event. She was selected for two World Cup races before the World Championships, finishing eighth and 33rd in two interval start races over 10 km, which was enough to be selected for competition in the 30 km distance at the 2007 Sapporo World Championships where she won a surprising bronze medal.

At the 2010 Winter Olympics in Vancouver, she won gold in the 4 × 5 km relay, came sixth in the 15 km pursuit and seventh in the 30 km mass start (classic) race.

Johaug won her first individual gold medal in the 30 km mass start race at the 2011 World Championships in Oslo. She also won gold in the 4 x 5 km relay, bronze in the 7.5 km + 7.5 km double pursuit and fourth in the 10 km individual start. At the 2013 World Championships, she won her second individual gold medal in the 10 km freestyle race.

At the 2014 Winter Olympics in Sochi, she won the silver medal in the 30 km mass start (free), the bronze medal in the 10 km classical, and finished fourth in the 15 km skiathlon.

Johaug and compatriot Martin Johnsrud Sundby became the first Norwegians to win the Tour de Ski when they won the women's and men's competitions in the 2013–14 edition of the race. Johaug subsequently won the overall and distance competitions in the 2013–14 FIS Cross-Country World Cup.

She won the Birkebeinerrennet ski marathon in 2015 with a time of 2.41.46. That year she also enjoyed her most successful World Championship performance in Falun, where she took three gold medals: two in individual events (the 15km skiathlon and the 30km classic mass start) and one as part of the Norwegian women's team in the 4x5km relay.

Johaug followed her World Championship success with her best-ever World Cup season in 2015–16, winning a second Tour de Ski by overturning a 39-second deficit to Ingvild Flugstad Østberg on the final stage to complete the climb up Alpe Cermis with a lead of 2 minutes 21 seconds over runner-up Østberg. She went on to capture the overall and distance World Cups, rounding off her season by winning the inaugural Ski Tour Canada in a similar fashion to her Tour de Ski win, eradicating Heidi Weng's 30-second lead on the final stage pursuit to take victory by over a minute.

Until 2016 Egil Kristiansen coached Johaug, and was described (by media) as "in reality her best coach ... [and he had] helped her master freestyle" skiing.

In August 2019, Johaug competed in the Norwegian national athletics championship and won the 10,000 metres on 32:20.87. She followed this up with a time of 31:33.15 in May 2021 falling just 8 seconds short of an Olympic berth.

In May 2025, less than a year before the 2026 Olympics, Johaug announced her retirement from competitions.

== Anti-doping rule violation ==
Johaug served an 18-month competition ban from October 2016 to April 2018 for an anti-doping rule violation after testing positive for unintentional use of clostebol. An initial suspension of 13-months was overturned and extended by the Court of Arbitration for Sport (CAS) following an appeal by the International Ski Federation (FIS). The ruling accepted Johaug's explanation that the source of the clostebol was an ointment provided by the team physician, Fredrik Bendiksen, but it was deemed that Johaug to have "failed to conduct a basic check of [the treatment's] packaging".

== Cross-country skiing results ==
All results are sourced from the International Ski Federation (FIS).

=== Olympic Games ===
- 6 medals – (4 gold, 1 silver, 1 bronze)

Year	Age	10 km individual	15 km skiathlon	30 km mass start	Sprint	4 × 5 km relay	Team sprint
2010	21	—	6	7	—	Gold	—
2014	25	Bronze	4	Silver	—	5	—
2022	33	Gold	Gold	Gold	—	5	—

=== World Championships ===
- 23 medals – (14 gold, 5 silver, 4 bronze)

Year	Age	10 km individual	15/20 km skiathlon	30/50 km mass start	Sprint	4 × 5/7.5 km relay	Team sprint
2007	18	—	—	Bronze	—	—	—
2009	20	10	6	4	—	4	—
2011	22	4	Bronze	Gold	—	Gold	—
2013	24	Gold	Silver	Bronze	—	Gold	—
2015	26	27	Gold	Gold	—	Gold	—
2019	30	Gold	Gold	Gold	—	Silver	—
2021	32	Gold	Gold	Gold	—	Gold	—
2025	36	Silver	Silver	Bronze	—	Silver	—

=== World Cup ===
- 8 titles – (3 Overall, 5 Distance)

Season
Season	Discipline
2014	Overall
2014	Distance
2016	Overall
2016	Distance
2019	Distance
2020	Overall
2020	Distance
2022	Distance

Season	Age	Discipline standings			Ski Tour standings				
Season	Age	Overall	Distance	Sprint	Nordic Opening	Tour de Ski	Ski Tour 2020	World Cup Final	Ski Tour Canada
2007	18	44	23	—	—N/a	—	—N/a	—N/a	—N/a
2008	19	18	15	47	—N/a	4	—N/a	21	—N/a
2009	20	8	7	89	—N/a	6	—N/a	2nd place, silver medalist(s)	—N/a
2010	21	17	14	61	—N/a	DNF	—N/a	7	—N/a
2011	22	4	3rd place, bronze medalist(s)	70	10	2nd place, silver medalist(s)	—N/a	3rd place, bronze medalist(s)	—N/a
2012	23	3rd place, bronze medalist(s)	3rd place, bronze medalist(s)	38	2nd place, silver medalist(s)	3rd place, bronze medalist(s)	—N/a	4	—N/a
2013	24	2nd place, silver medalist(s)	2nd place, silver medalist(s)	39	4	2nd place, silver medalist(s)	—N/a	2nd place, silver medalist(s)	—N/a
2014	25	1st place, gold medalist(s)	1st place, gold medalist(s)	32	3rd place, bronze medalist(s)	1st place, gold medalist(s)	—N/a	1st place, gold medalist(s)	—N/a
2015	26	2nd place, silver medalist(s)	2nd place, silver medalist(s)	39	2nd place, silver medalist(s)	2nd place, silver medalist(s)	—N/a	—N/a	—N/a
2016	27	1st place, gold medalist(s)	1st place, gold medalist(s)	16	1st place, gold medalist(s)	1st place, gold medalist(s)	—N/a	—N/a	1st place, gold medalist(s)
2019	30	3rd place, bronze medalist(s)	1st place, gold medalist(s)	72	1st place, gold medalist(s)	—	—N/a	2nd place, silver medalist(s)	—N/a
2020	31	1st place, gold medalist(s)	1st place, gold medalist(s)	17	1st place, gold medalist(s)	1st place, gold medalist(s)	1st place, gold medalist(s)	—N/a	—N/a
2021	32	9	5	87	1st place, gold medalist(s)	—	—N/a	—N/a	—N/a
2022	33	5	1st place, gold medalist(s)	—	—N/a	—	—N/a	—N/a	—N/a
2025	36	5	5	96	—N/a	1st place, gold medalist(s)	—N/a	—N/a	—N/a

==== Individual podiums ====
- 89 victories – (50 WC, 39 SWC)
- 160 podiums – (89 WC, 71 SWC)

No.	Season	Date	Location	Race	Level	Place
1	2006–07	24 March 2007	Falun, Sweden	7.5 km + 7.5 km Pursuit C/F	World Cup	3rd
2	2007–08	2 January 2008	Nové Město, Czech Republic	10 km Individual C	Stage World Cup	3rd
3	2007–08	9 January 2008	Otepää, Estonia	10 km Individual C	World Cup	3rd
4	2008–09	6 December 2008	La Clusaz, France	15 km Mass Start F	World Cup	3rd
5	2008–09	4 January 2009	Val di Fiemme, Italy	9 km Pursuit F	Stage World Cup	1st
6	2008–09	21 March 2009	Falun, Sweden	5 km + 5 km Pursuit C/F	Stage World Cup	2nd
7	2008–09	22 March 2009	Falun, Sweden	10 km Pursuit F	Stage World Cup	2nd
8	2008–09	18–22 March 2009	(Sweden) World Cup Final	Overall Standings	World Cup	2nd
9	2009–10	6 March 2010	Lahti, Finland	7.5 km + 7.5 km Pursuit C/F	World Cup	3rd
10	2009–10	13 March 2010	Oslo, Norway	30 km Mass Start F	World Cup	3rd
11	2009–10	20 March 2010	Falun, Sweden	5 km + 5 km Pursuit C/F	Stage World Cup	3rd
12	2010–11	28 November 2010	Rukatunturi, Finland	10 km Pursuit F	Stage World Cup	1st
13	2010–11	11 December 2010	Davos, Switzerland	10 km Individual C	World Cup	3rd
14	2010–11	8 January 2011	Val di Fiemme, Italy	10 km Mass Start C	Stage World Cup	2nd
15	2010–11	9 January 2011	Val di Fiemme, Italy	9 km Pursuit F	Stage World Cup	1st
16	2010–11	31 December 2010 – 9 January 2011	(Germany) (Italy) Tour de Ski	Overall Standings	World Cup	2nd
17	2010–11	22 January 2011	Otepää, Estonia	10 km Individual C	World Cup	3rd
18	2010–11	12 March 2011	Lahti, Finland	5 km + 5 km Pursuit C/F	World Cup	1st
19	2010–11	18 March 2011	Falun, Sweden	2.5 km Individual C	Stage World Cup	3rd
20	2010–11	19 March 2011	Falun, Sweden	5 km + 5 km Pursuit C/F	Stage World Cup	3rd
21	2010–11	20 March 2011	Falun, Sweden	10 km Pursuit F	Stage World Cup	3rd
22	2010–11	16–20 March 2011	(Sweden) World Cup Final	Overall Standings	World Cup	3rd
23	2011–12	27 November 2011	Rukatunturi, Finland	10 km Pursuit C	Stage World Cup	1st
24	2011–12	25–27 November 2011	(Finland) Nordic Opening	Overall Standings	World Cup	2nd
25	2011–12	10 December 2011	Davos, Switzerland	15 km Individual F	World Cup	3rd
26	2011–12	17 December 2011	Rogla, Slovenia	10 km Mass Start C	World Cup	2nd
27	2011–12	30 December 2011	Oberhof, Germany	10 km Pursuit C	Stage World Cup	2nd
28	2011–12	1 January 2012	Oberstdorf, Germany	5 km + 5 km Skiathlon C/F	Stage World Cup	3rd
29	2011–12	5 January 2012	Toblach, Italy	15 km Pursuit F	Stage World Cup	3rd
30	2011–12	8 January 2012	Val di Fiemme, Italy	9 km Pursuit F	Stage World Cup	1st
31	2011–12	29 December 2011 – 8 January 2012	(Germany) (Italy) Tour de Ski	Overall Standings	World Cup	3rd
32	2011–12	22 January 2012	Otepää, Estonia	10 km Individual C	World Cup	3rd
33	2011–12	5 February 2012	Rybinsk, Russia	7.5 km + 7.5 km Skiathlon C/F	World Cup	1st
34	2011–12	11 February 2012	Nové Město, Czech Republic	15 km Mass Start C	World Cup	3rd
35	2011–12	18 February 2012	Szklarska Poręba, Poland	10 km Individual C	World Cup	3rd
36	2011–12	3 March 2012	Lahti, Finland	7.5 km + 7.5 km Skiathlon C/F	World Cup	1st
37	2011–12	11 March 2012	Oslo, Norway	30 km Mass Start C	World Cup	3rd
38	2011–12	17 March 2012	Falun, Sweden	10 km Mass Start C	Stage World Cup	3rd
39	2011–12	18 March 2012	Falun, Sweden	10 km Pursuit F	Stage World Cup	1st
40	2012–13	24 November 2012	Gällivare, Sweden	10 km Individual F	World Cup	2nd
41	2012–13	2 December 2012	Rukatunturi, Finland	10 km Pursuit C	Stage World Cup	2nd
42	2012–13	30 December 2012	Oberhof, Germany	9 km Pursuit C	Stage World Cup	2nd
43	2012–13	3 January 2013	(Italy) Toblach-Cortina	15 km Pursuit F	Stage World Cup	3rd
44	2012–13	6 January 2013	Val di Fiemme, Italy	9 km Pursuit F	Stage World Cup	1st
45	2012–13	29 December 2012 – 6 January 2013	(Germany) (Switzerland) (Italy) Tour de Ski	Overall Standings	World Cup	2nd
46	2012–13	19 January 2013	La Clusaz, France	10 km Mass Start C	World Cup	2nd
47	2012–13	17 February 2013	Davos, Switzerland	10 km Individual F	World Cup	1st
48	2012–13	17 March 2013	Oslo, Norway	30 km Mass Start F	World Cup	1st
49	2012–13	23 March 2013	Falun, Sweden	10 km Mass Start C	Stage World Cup	2nd
50	2012–13	24 March 2013	Falun, Sweden	10 km Pursuit F	Stage World Cup	1st
51	2012–13	20–24 March 2013	(Sweden) World Cup Final	Overall Standings	World Cup	2nd
52	2013–14	30 November 2013	Rukatunturi, Finland	5 km Individual C	Stage World Cup	3rd
53	2013–14	1 December 2013	Rukatunturi, Finland	10 km Pursuit F	Stage World Cup	2nd
54	2013–14	29 November – 1 December 2013	(Finland) Nordic Opening	Overall Standings	World Cup	3rd
55	2013–14	14 December 2013	Davos, Switzerland	15 km Individual F	World Cup	2nd
56	2013–14	1 January 2014	Lenzerheide, Switzerland	10 km Mass Start	Stage World Cup	3rd
57	2013–14	3 January 2014	(Italy) Toblach-Cortina	15 km Pursuit F	Stage World Cup	2nd
58	2013–14	4 January 2014	Val di Fiemme, Italy	5 km Individual C	Stage World Cup	1st
59	2013–14	5 January 2014	Val di Fiemme, Italy	9 km Pursuit F	Stage World Cup	1st
60	2013–14	28 December 2013 – 5 January 2014	(Germany) (Switzerland) (Italy) Tour de Ski	Overall Standings	World Cup	1st
61	2013–14	1 February 2014	Toblach, Italy	10 km Individual C	World Cup	2nd
62	2013–14	2 March 2014	Lahti, Finland	10 km Individual F	World Cup	3rd
63	2013–14	9 March 2014	Oslo, Norway	30 km Mass Start C	World Cup	2nd
64	2013–14	15 March 2014	Falun, Sweden	7.5 km + 7.5 km Skiathlon C/F	Stage World Cup	1st
65	2013–14	16 March 2014	Falun, Sweden	10 km Pursuit F	Stage World Cup	1st
66	2013–14	14–16 March 2014	(Sweden) World Cup Final	Overall Standings	World Cup	1st
67	2014–15	30 November 2014	Rukatunturi, Finland	10 km Individual C	World Cup	1st
68	2014–15	6 December 2014	Lillehammer, Norway	5 km Individual F	Stage World Cup	1st
69	2014–15	7 December 2014	Lillehammer, Norway	10 km Pursuit C	Stage World Cup	1st
70	2014–15	5–7 December 2014	(Norway) Nordic Opening	Overall Standings	World Cup	2nd
71	2014–15	13 December 2014	Davos, Switzerland	10 km Individual C	World Cup	1st
72	2014–15	4 January 2015	Oberstdorf, Germany	10 km Pursuit C	Stage World Cup	3rd
73	2014–15	7 January 2015	Toblach, Italy	5 km Individual C	Stage World Cup	2nd
74	2014–15	8 January 2015	Toblach, Italy	15 km Pursuit F	Stage World Cup	3rd
75	2014–15	10 January 2015	Val di Fiemme, Italy	10 km Mass Start C	Stage World Cup	1st
76	2014–15	11 January 2015	Val di Fiemme, Italy	9 km Pursuit F	Stage World Cup	1st
77	2014–15	3–11 January 2015	(Germany) (Switzerland) (Italy) Tour de Ski	Overall Standings	World Cup	2nd
78	2014–15	15 February 2015	Östersund, Sweden	10 km Individual F	World Cup	3rd
79	2014–15	15 March 2015	Oslo, Norway	30 km Mass Start F	World Cup	2nd
80	2015–16	28 November 2015	Rukatunturi, Finland	5 km Individual F	Stage World Cup	1st
81	2015–16	29 November 2015	Rukatunturi, Finland	10 km Pursuit C	Stage World Cup	1st
82	2015–16	27–29 November 2015	(Finland) Nordic Opening	Overall Standings	World Cup	1st
83	2015–16	5 December 2015	Lillehammer, Norway	7.5 km + 7.5 km Skiathlon C/F	World Cup	1st
84	2015–16	12 December 2015	Davos, Switzerland	15 km Individual F	World Cup	1st
85	2015–16	20 December 2015	Toblach, Italy	10 km Individual C	World Cup	1st
86	2015–16	2 January 2016	Lenzerheide, Switzerland	15 km Mass Start C	Stage World Cup	1st
87	2015–16	3 January 2016	Lenzerheide, Switzerland	5 km Pursuit F	Stage World Cup	2nd
88	2015–16	6 January 2016	Oberstdorf, Germany	10 km Mass Start C	Stage World Cup	1st
89	2015–16	9 January 2016	Val di Fiemme, Italy	10 km Mass Start C	Stage World Cup	3rd
90	2015–16	10 January 2016	Val di Fiemme, Italy	9 km Pursuit F	Stage World Cup	1st
91	2015–16	1–10 January 2016	(Switzerland) (Germany) (Italy) Tour de Ski	Overall Standings	World Cup	1st
92	2015–16	23 January 2016	Nové Město, Czech Republic	10 km Individual F	World Cup	1st
93	2015–16	7 February 2016	Oslo, Norway	30 km Mass Start C	World Cup	1st
94	2015–16	13 February 2016	Falun, Sweden	5 km Individual C	World Cup	1st
95	2015–16	14 February 2016	Falun, Sweden	10 km Mass Start F	World Cup	1st
96	2015–16	21 February 2016	Lahti, Finland	7.5 km + 7.5 km Skiathlon C/F	World Cup	1st
97	2015–16	2 March 2016	Montreal, Canada	10.5 km Mass Start C	Stage World Cup	1st
98	2015–16	5 March 2016	Quebec City, Canada	10 km Pursuit F	Stage World Cup	2nd
99	2015–16	9 March 2016	Canmore, Canada	7.5 km + 7.5 km Skiathlon C/F	Stage World Cup	2nd
100	2015–16	12 March 2016	Canmore, Canada	10 km Pursuit C	Stage World Cup	2nd
101	2015–16	1–12 March 2016	Ski Tour Canada	Overall Standings	World Cup	1st
102	2018–19	25 November 2018	Rukatunturi, Finland	10 km Individual C	World Cup	1st
103	2018–19	1 December 2018	Lillehammer, Norway	10 km Individual F	Stage World Cup	1st
104	2018–19	2 December 2018	Lillehammer, Norway	10 km Pursuit C	Stage World Cup	1st
105	2018–19	30 November – 2 December 2018	(Norway) Nordic Opening	Overall Standings	World Cup	1st
106	2018–19	8 December 2018	Beitostølen, Norway	15 km Individual F	World Cup	1st
107	2018–19	16 December 2018	Davos, Switzerland	10 km Individual F	World Cup	1st
108	2018–19	20 January 2019	Otepää, Estonia	10 km Individual C	World Cup	1st
109	2018–19	26 January 2019	Ulricehamn, Sweden	10 km Individual F	World Cup	1st
110	2018–19	10 March 2019	Oslo, Norway	30 km Mass Start C	World Cup	1st
111	2018–19	17 March 2019	Falun, Sweden	10 km Individual F	World Cup	1st
112	2018–19	23 March 2019	Quebec City, Canada	10 km Mass Start C	Stage World Cup	2nd
113	2018–19	24 March 2019	Quebec City, Canada	10 km Pursuit F	Stage World Cup	1st
114	2018–19	24 March 2019	(Canada) World Cup Final	Overall Standings	World Cup	2nd
115	2019–20	30 November 2019	Rukatunturi, Finland	10 km Individual C	Stage World Cup	1st
116	2019–20	1 December 2019	Rukatunturi, Finland	10 km Pursuit F	Stage World Cup	1st
117	2019–20	29 November – 1 December 2019	(Finland) Nordic Opening	Overall Standings	World Cup	1st
118	2019–20	7 December 2019	Lillehammer, Norway	7.5 km + 7.5 km Skiathlon C/F	World Cup	1st
119	2019–20	15 December 2019	Davos, Switzerland	10 km Individual F	World Cup	1st
120	2019–20	28 December 2019	Lenzerheide, Switzerland	10 km Mass Start F	Stage World Cup	1st
121	2019–20	31 December 2019	Toblach, Italy	10 km Individual F	Stage World Cup	1st
122	2019–20	1 January 2020	Toblach, Italy	10 km Pursuit C	Stage World Cup	2nd
123	2019–20	5 January 2020	Val di Fiemme, Italy	10 km Mass Start F	Stage World Cup	1st
124	2019–20	28 December 2019 – 5 January 2020	(Switzerland) (Italy) Tour de Ski	Overall Standings	World Cup	1st
125	2019–20	18 January 2020	Nové Město, Czech Republic	10 km Individual F	World Cup	1st
126	2019–20	19 January 2020	Nové Město, Czech Republic	10 km Pursuit C	World Cup	1st
127	2019–20	25 January 2020	Oberstdorf, Germany	7.5 km + 7.5 km Skiathlon C/F	World Cup	1st
128	2019–20	9 February 2020	Falun, Sweden	10 km Mass Start F	World Cup	1st
129	2019–20	15 February 2020	Östersund, Sweden	10 km Individual F	Stage World Cup	1st
130	2019–20	16 February 2020	Östersund, Sweden	10 km Pursuit C	Stage World Cup	1st
131	2019–20	18 February 2020	Åre, Sweden	0.7 km Sprint F	Stage World Cup	1st
132	2019–20	20 February 2020	Meråker, Norway	34 km Mass Start F	Stage World Cup	1st
133	2019–20	23 February 2020	Trondheim, Norway	15 km Pursuit C	Stage World Cup	1st
134	2019–20	15–23 February 2020	(Sweden) (Norway) FIS Ski Tour 2020	Overall Standings	World Cup	1st
135	2019–20	29 February 2020	Lahti, Finland	10 km Individual C	World Cup	1st
136	2019–20	7 March 2020	Oslo, Norway	30 km Mass Start C	World Cup	2nd
137	2020–21	28 November 2020	Rukatunturi, Finland	10 km Individual C	Stage World Cup	1st
138	2020–21	29 November 2020	Rukatunturi, Finland	10 km Pursuit F	Stage World Cup	1st
139	2020–21	27–29 November 2020	(Finland) Nordic Opening	Overall Standings	World Cup	1st
140	2020–21	23 January 2021	Lahti, Finland	7.5 km + 7.5 km Skiathlon C/F	World Cup	1st
141	2020–21	29 January 2021	Falun, Sweden	10 km Individual F	World Cup	2nd
142	2020–21	30 January 2021	Falun, Sweden	10 km Mass Start C	World Cup	3rd
143	2021–22	27 November 2021	Rukatunturi, Finland	10 km Individual C	World Cup	2nd
144	2021–22	28 November 2021	Rukatunturi, Finland	10 km Pursuit F	World Cup	1st
145	2021–22	4 December 2021	Lillehammer, Norway	10 km Individual F	World Cup	2nd
146	2021–22	12 December 2021	Davos, Switzerland	10 km Individual F	World Cup	1st
147	2021–22	27 February 2022	Lahti, Finland	10 km Individual C	World Cup	1st
148	2021–22	5 March 2022	Oslo, Norway	30 km Mass Start C	World Cup	1st
149	2021–22	12 March 2022	Falun, Sweden	10 km Individual F	World Cup	1st
150	2024–25	29 November 2024	Rukatunturi, Finland	10 km Individual C	World Cup	2nd
151	2024–25	6 December 2024	Lillehammer, Norway	10 km Individual F	World Cup	1st
152	2024–25	8 December 2024	Lillehammer, Norway	10 km +10 km Skiathlon C/F	World Cup	1st
153	2024–25	15 December 2024	Davos, Switzerland	20 km Individual C	World Cup	3rd
154	2024–25	31 December 2024	Toblach, Italy	20 km Individual F	Stage World Cup	2nd
155	2024–25	1 January 2025	Toblach, Italy	15 km Pursuit C	Stage World Cup	2nd
156	2024–25	4 January 2025	Val di Fiemme, Italy	10 km +10 km Skiathlon C/F	Stage World Cup	1st
157	2024–25	5 January 2025	Val di Fiemme, Italy	10 km Mass Start F	Stage World Cup	1st
158	2024–25	28 December 2024 – 5 January 2025	(Italy) Tour de Ski	Overall Standings	World Cup	1st
159	2024–25	15 March 2025	Oslo, Norway	20 km Individual C	World Cup	1st
160	2024–25	23 March 2025	Lahti, Finland	50 km Mass Start C	World Cup	1st

==== Team podiums ====
- 18 victories – (18 RL)
- 22 podiums – (22 RL)

No.	Season	Date	Location	Race	Level	Place	Teammates
1	2007–08	25 November 2007	Beitostølen, Norway	4 × 5 km Relay C/F	World Cup	1st	Jacobsen / Skofterud / Bjørgen
2	2007–08	9 December 2007	Davos, Switzerland	4 × 5 km Relay C/F	World Cup	1st	Stemland / Steira / Skofterud
3	2008–09	23 November 2008	Gällivare, Sweden	4 × 5 km Relay C/F	World Cup	1st	Bjørgen / Steira / Kristoffersen
4	2008–09	7 December 2008	La Clusaz, France	4 × 5 km Relay C/F	World Cup	3rd	Stemland / Nilsen / Steira
5	2009–10	22 November 2009	Beitostølen, Norway	4 × 5 km Relay C/F	World Cup	2nd	Skofterud / Steira / Bjørgen
6	2009–10	7 March 2010	Lahti, Finland	4 × 5 km Relay C/F	World Cup	1st	Kristoffersen / Steira / Bjørgen
7	2010–11	21 November 2010	Gällivare, Sweden	4 × 5 km Relay C/F	World Cup	1st	Skofterud / Steira / Bjørgen
8	2010–11	19 December 2010	La Clusaz, France	4 × 5 km Relay C/F	World Cup	1st	Skofterud / Steira / Bjørgen
9	2011–12	21 November 2011	Sjusjøen, Norway	4 × 5 km Relay C/F	World Cup	1st	Skofterud / Steira / Bjørgen
10	2011–12	19 December 2011	Nové Město, Czech Republic	4 × 5 km Relay C/F	World Cup	1st	Skofterud / Jacobsen / Bjørgen
11	2012–13	25 November 2012	Gällivare, Sweden	4 × 5 km Relay C/F	World Cup	1st	Skofterud / Hagen / Bjørgen
12	2012–13	20 January 2013	La Clusaz, France	4 × 5 km Relay C/F	World Cup	1st	Weng / Steira / Bjørgen
13	2013–14	8 December 2013	Lillehammer, Norway	4 × 5 km Relay C/F	World Cup	1st	Weng / Steira / Bjørgen
14	2015–16	6 December 2015	Lillehammer, Norway	4 × 5 km Relay C/F	World Cup	1st	Falla / Østberg / Weng
15	2015–16	24 January 2016	Nové Město, Czech Republic	4 × 5 km Relay C/F	World Cup	1st	Østberg / Weng / Jacobsen
16	2018–19	9 December 2018	Beitostølen, Norway	4 × 5 km Relay C/F	World Cup	1st	Weng / Haga / Østberg
17	2018–19	27 January 2019	Ulricehamn, Sweden	4 × 5 km Relay C/F	World Cup	1st	Weng / Jacobsen / Østberg
18	2019–20	8 December 2019	Lillehammer, Norway	4 × 5 km Relay C/F	World Cup	1st	Falla / Jacobsen / Weng
19	2019–20	1 March 2020	Lahti, Finland	4 × 5 km Relay C/F	World Cup	1st	T. Udnes Weng / Østberg / Weng
20	2020–21	24 January 2021	Lahti, Finland	4 × 5 km Relay C/F	World Cup	1st	T. Udnes Weng / Fossesholm / Weng
21	2021–22	5 December 2021	Lillehammer, Norway	4 × 5 km Relay C/F	World Cup	3rd	T. Udnes Weng / Weng / Fossesholm
22	2021–22	13 March 2022	Falun, Sweden	4 × 5 km Mixed Relay F	World Cup	3rd	Weng / Holund / Tønseth

==== Overall record ====
Result	Distance Races^{[a]}							Sprint	Ski Tours	Individual Events	Team Events		All Events
Result	≤ 5 km^{[b]}	≤ 10 km^{[b]}	≤ 15 km^{[b]}	≤ 30 km^{[b]}	≥ 30 km^{[b]}	Pursuit^{[c]}	Skiathlon	Sprint	Ski Tours	Individual Events	Team Sprint	Relay	All Events
1st place	4	12	3	2	—	16	5	—	6	48	—	14	62
2nd place	1	7	1	2	—	9	1	—	7	28	—	1	29
3rd place	2	11	3	2	—	8	1	—	3	30	—	1	31
Podiums	7	30	7	6	—	33	7	—	16	106	—	16	122
Top 10	15	50	7	8	—	38	7	5	22	152	—	18	170
Points	26	59	10	8	—	42	7	30	22	204	—	18	222
Others	1	1	—	—	—	—	—	16	1^{[d]}	19	—	—	19
Starts	27	60	10	8	–	42	7	46	23	223	—	18	241

a. ^{1} Classification is made according to FIS classification.
b. ^{1} ^{2} ^{3} ^{4} ^{5} Includes individual and mass start races.
c. ^{1} Includes pursuit and double pursuit races.
d. ^{1} Withdrawn from 2009–10 Tour de Ski.

== Sponsors ==
As of 13 October 2016, her sponsors were Tag Heuer, Huawei, Isklar and Eger.

The sponsorship with Huawei ended in December 2020.
