= Hilde Gjermundshaug Pedersen =

Norwegian orienteer

Personal information
- Nationality: Norway
- Born: 8 November 1964 (age 61) Hamar, Norway

Sport
- Sport: Skiing
- Club: Nybygda IL

World Cup career
- Seasons: 13 – (1984–1985, 1998–2008)
- Indiv. starts: 125
- Indiv. podiums: 13
- Indiv. wins: 1
- Team starts: 33
- Team podiums: 24
- Team wins: 16
- Overall titles: 0 – (4th in 2004)
- Discipline titles: 0
Medal record
Women's cross-country skiing
Representing Norway
Olympic Games
| Silver medal – second place | 2002 Salt Lake City | 4 × 5 km relay |
| Bronze medal – third place | 2006 Turin | 10 km classical |
World Championships
| Gold medal – first place | 2005 Oberstdorf | Team sprint |
| Gold medal – first place | 2005 Oberstdorf | 4 × 5 km relay |
| Silver medal – second place | 2001 Lahti | 4 × 5 km relay |
| Silver medal – second place | 2003 Val di Fiemme | 4 × 5 km relay |
| Bronze medal – third place | 2003 Val di Fiemme | Individual sprint |
| Bronze medal – third place | 2003 Val di Fiemme | 10 km classical |
Junior World Championships
| Gold medal – first place | 1984 Trondheim | 3 × 5 km relay |
| Silver medal – second place | 1983 Kuopio | 5 km |
| Silver medal – second place | 1983 Kuopio | 3 × 5 km relay |
| Silver medal – second place | 1984 Trondheim | 5 km |
Women's ski-orienteering
World Championships
| Silver medal – second place | 1994 Val di Non | Short distance |
| Silver medal – second place | 1994 Val di Non | Relay |
| Silver medal – second place | 1996 Lillehammer | Classic distance |
| Bronze medal – third place | 1998 Windischgarsten | Relay |
| Bronze medal – third place | 1992 Pontarlier | Relay |

Hilde Gjermundshaug Pedersen (born 8 November 1964) is a Norwegian cross-country skier. Her first Olympic medal was a silver 4 × 5 km relay at the 2002 Winter Olympics in Salt Lake City. At the 2006 Winter Olympics in Turin, she took the bronze medal in the 10 km classical interval start event. Pedersen is the oldest woman ever to win a cross country skiing World Cup race, which she did at age 41 in January 2006 in Otepää, Estonia.

Gjermundshaug Pedersen has also won six medals at the FIS Nordic World Ski Championships, including two golds (4 × 5 km relay, team sprint: both 2005), two silvers (4 × 5 km relay: 2001, 2003), and two bronzes (Individual sprint, 10 km: both 2003).

In 2004, she won Tjejvasan.

She also won the Egebergs Ærespris in 2002. This prestigious prize is awarded to athletes who reach international top level in one sport and concurrently perform at national level (or better) in a second sport. Gjermundshaug Pedersen has also competed in ski orienteering, a sport in which she received three silver medals and two bronze medals in the World championships, and she has also won the overall World Cup (1997).

At age 42, Gjermundshaug Pedersen decided to make a comeback in the World Cup for the 2006–07 season. In January 2008 she won her seventh Norwegian Championships gold medal, in the 10 km interval start race.

An unparalleled historic curiosum is the Norwegian Cross-Country Skiing Championship 3 × 5 km relay of 2006, where the entire winning team of Nybygda consisted of Gjermundshaug Pedersens: mother Hilde with her two twin daughters Eli and Ida.

== Cross-country skiing results ==
All results are sourced from the International Ski Federation (FIS).

=== Olympic Games ===
- 2 medals – (1 gold, 1 bronze)

| Year | Age | 10 km | 15 km | Pursuit | 30 km | Sprint | 4 × 5 km relay | Team sprint |
|---|---|---|---|---|---|---|---|---|
| 2002 | 37 | 6 | 14 | 14 | — | 19 | Silver | —N/a |
| 2006 | 41 | Bronze | —N/a | 10 | — | 28 | 5 | — |

=== World Championships ===
- 6 medals – (2 gold, 2 silver, 2 bronze)

| Year | Age | 5 km | 10 km | 15 km | Pursuit | 30 km | Sprint | 4 × 5 km relay | Team sprint |
|---|---|---|---|---|---|---|---|---|---|
| 1999 | 34 | — | —N/a | 14 | — | — | — | — | —N/a |
| 2001 | 36 | —N/a | 6 | 4 | — | — | — | Silver | —N/a |
| 2003 | 38 | —N/a | Bronze | 4 | 4 | DNF | Bronze | Silver | —N/a |
| 2005 | 40 | —N/a | — | —N/a | 11 | — | — | Gold | Gold |

=== World Cup ===
==== Season standings ====
| Season | Age | Discipline standings | | | | | Ski Tour standings | |
| Season | Age | Overall | Distance | Long Distance | Middle Distance | Sprint | Tour de Ski | World Cup Final |
|---|---|---|---|---|---|---|---|---|
| 1984 | 18 | 45 | —N/a | —N/a | —N/a | —N/a | —N/a | —N/a |
| 1985 | 20 | 56 | —N/a | —N/a | —N/a | —N/a | —N/a | —N/a |
| 1998 | 33 | NC | —N/a | NC | —N/a | — | —N/a | —N/a |
| 1999 | 34 | 43 | —N/a | 32 | —N/a | 71 | —N/a | —N/a |
| 2000 | 35 | 16 | —N/a | 21 | 21 | 7 | —N/a | —N/a |
| 2001 | 36 | 14 | —N/a | —N/a | —N/a | 19 | —N/a | —N/a |
| 2002 | 37 | 6 | —N/a | —N/a | —N/a | 5 | —N/a | —N/a |
| 2003 | 38 | 5 | —N/a | —N/a | —N/a | 6 | —N/a | —N/a |
| 2004 | 39 | 4 | 4 | —N/a | —N/a | 8 | —N/a | —N/a |
| 2005 | 40 | 6 | 6 | —N/a | —N/a | 10 | —N/a | —N/a |
| 2006 | 41 | 8 | 6 | —N/a | —N/a | 20 | —N/a | —N/a |
| 2007 | 42 | 45 | 25 | —N/a | —N/a | — | — | —N/a |
| 2008 | 43 | 69 | 44 | —N/a | —N/a | — | — | — |

==== Individual podiums ====
- 1 victory
- 13 podiums

| No. | Season | Date | Location | Race | Level | Place |
|---|---|---|---|---|---|---|
| 1 | 2001–02 | 9 December 2001 | Cogne, Italy | 1.5 km Sprint F | World Cup | 3rd |
| 2 | 2001–02 | 6 January 2002 | Val di Fiemme, Italy | 1.5 km Sprint F | World Cup | 2nd |
| 3 | 2002–03 | 15 December 2002 | Cogne, Italy | 1.5 km Sprint C | World Cup | 3rd |
| 4 | 2002–03 | 19 December 2002 | Linz, Austria | 1.5 km Sprint F | World Cup | 2nd |
| 5 | 2002–03 | 25 January 2003 | Oberhof, Germany | 10 km Mass Start C | World Cup | 2nd |
| 6 | 2003–04 | 10 January 2004 | Otepää, Estonia | 15 km Mass Start C | World Cup | 3rd |
| 7 | 2003–04 | 14 February 2004 | Oberstdorf, Germany | 7.5 km + 7.5 km Pursuit C/F | World Cup | 2nd |
| 8 | 2003–04 | 21 February 2004 | Umeå, Sweden | 10 km Individual C | World Cup | 2nd |
| 9 | 2004–05 | 8 January 2005 | Otepää, Estonia | 10 Individual C | World Cup | 2nd |
| 10 | 2005–06 | 10 December 2005 | Vernon, Canada | 7.5 km + 7.5 km Pursuit C/F | World Cup | 3rd |
| 11 | 2005–06 | 7 January 2006 | Otepää, Estonia | 10 km Individual C | World Cup | 1st |
| 12 | 2005–06 | 4 March 2006 | Mora, Sweden | 45 km Mass Start C | World Cup | 2nd |
| 13 | 2005–06 | 9 March 2006 | Drammen, Norway | 1.2 km Sprint C | World Cup | 3rd |

==== Team podiums ====
- 16 victories – (9 RL, 7 TS)
- 24 podiums – (17 RL, 7 TS)

| No. | Season | Date | Location | Race | Level | Place | Teammate(s) |
|---|---|---|---|---|---|---|---|
| 1 | 1985–86 | 13 March 1986 | Oslo, Norway | 4 × 5 km Relay F | World Cup | 3rd | Nybråten / Nykkelmo / Tangen |
| 2 | 1999–00 | 28 November 1999 | Kiruna, Sweden | 4 × 5 km Relay F | World Cup | 3rd | Martinsen / Nilsen / Moen |
| 3 | 2000–01 | 9 December 2000 | Santa Caterina, Italy | 4 × 3 km Relay C/F | World Cup | 2nd | Bay / Skari / Nilsen |
| 4 | 2001–02 | 16 December 2001 | Davos, Switzerland | 4 × 5 km Relay C/F | World Cup | 1st | Bay / Skari / Skofterud |
| 5 | 2001–02 | 10 March 2002 | Falun, Sweden | 4 × 5 km Relay C/F | World Cup | 2nd | Moen / Bjørgen / Skofterud |
| 6 | 2002–03 | 8 December 2002 | Davos, Switzerland | 4 × 5 km Relay C/F | World Cup | 1st | Skofterud / Skari / Sorkmo |
| 7 | 2002–03 | 19 January 2003 | Nové Město, Czech Republic | 4 × 5 km Relay C/F | World Cup | 2nd | Moen / Bjørgen / Steira |
| 8 | 2002–03 | 23 January 2003 | Oberhof, Germany | 6 × 1.5 km Team Sprint F | World Cup | 1st | Moen |
| 9 | 2002–03 | 23 March 2003 | Falun, Sweden | 4 × 5 km Relay C/F | World Cup | 2nd | Moen / Steira / Skari |
| 10 | 2003–04 | 26 October 2003 | Düsseldorf, Germany | 6 × 0.8 km Team Sprint F | World Cup | 1st | Bjørgen |
| 11 | 2003–04 | 23 November 2003 | Beitostølen, Norway | 4 × 5 km Relay C/F | World Cup | 1st | Skofterud / Steira / Bjørgen |
| 12 | 2003–04 | 7 December 2003 | Toblach, Italy | 6 × 1.2 km Team Sprint F | World Cup | 1st | Bjørgen |
| 13 | 2003–04 | 14 December 2003 | Davos, Switzerland | 4 × 5 km Relay C/F | World Cup | 1st | Skofterud / Bjørgen / Stemland |
| 14 | 2003–04 | 11 January 2004 | Otepää, Estonia | 4 × 5 km Relay C/F | World Cup | 1st | Skofterud / Steira / Bjørgen |
| 15 | 2003–04 | 15 February 2004 | Oberstdorf, Germany | 6 × 0.8 km Team Sprint F | World Cup | 1st | Bjørgen |
| 16 | 2003–04 | 22 February 2004 | Umeå, Sweden | 4 × 5 km Relay C/F | World Cup | 1st | Skofterud / Bjørgen / Steira |
| 17 | 2003–04 | 6 March 2004 | Lahti, Finland | 6 × 1.0 km Team Sprint C | World Cup | 1st | Berg |
| 18 | 2004–05 | 24 October 2004 | Düsseldorf, Germany | 6 × 0.8 km Team Sprint F | World Cup | 1st | Bjørgen |
| 19 | 2004–05 | 24 November 2004 | Gällivare, Sweden | 4 × 5 km Relay C/F | World Cup | 1st | Bjørnås / Skofterud / Bjørgen |
| 20 | 2004–05 | 12 December 2004 | Val di Fiemme, Italy | 4 × 5 km Relay C/F | World Cup | 3rd | Bjørnås / Skofterud / Bjørgen |
| 21 | 2004–05 | 20 March 2005 | Falun, Sweden | 4 × 5 km Relay C/F | World Cup | 2nd | Bjørnås / Stemland / Bjørgen |
| 22 | 2005–06 | 23 October 2005 | Düsseldorf, Germany | 6 × 0.8 km Team Sprint F | World Cup | 1st | Bjørgen |
| 23 | 2005–06 | 20 November 2005 | Beitostølen, Norway | 4 × 5 km Relay C/F | World Cup | 1st | Berg / Skofterud / Bjørgen |
| 24 | 2006–07 | 19 November 2006 | Gällivare, Sweden | 4 × 5 km Relay C/F | World Cup | 1st | Skofterud / Steira / Bjørgen |

Awards
| Preceded by Anders Aukland | Egebergs Ærespris; 2002 | Succeeded by Trond Einar Elden |
