= Vibeke Skofterud =

Norwegian cross-country skier

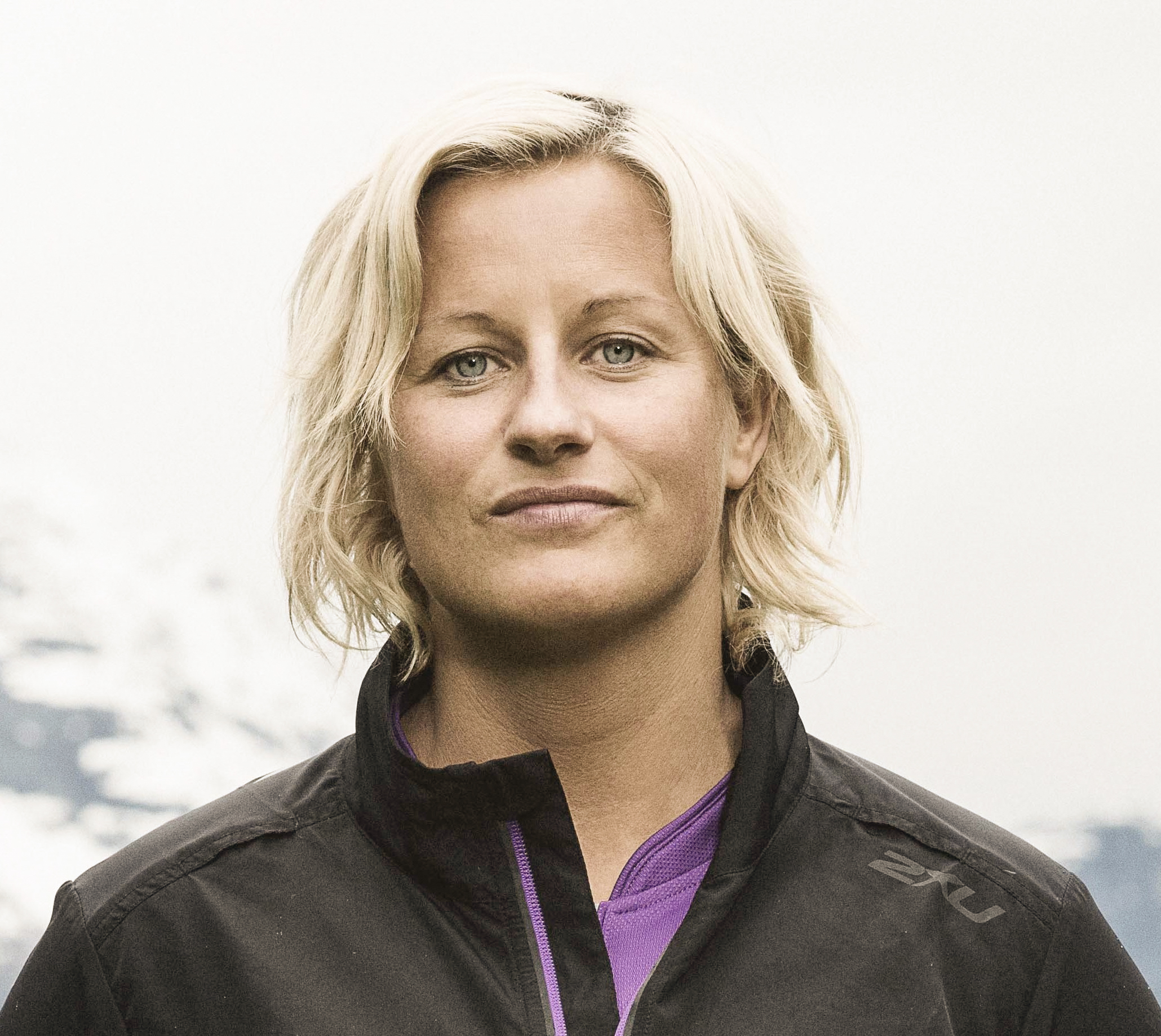
- Skofterud in May 2015

Personal information
- Full name: Vibeke Westbye Skofterud
- Nationality: Norway
- Born: 20 April 1980 Askim, Norway
- Died: 29 July 2018 (aged 38) Arendal, Norway

Sport
- Sport: Skiing
- Club: Slitu IF

World Cup career
- Seasons: 15 – (2000–2014)
- Indiv. starts: 191
- Indiv. podiums: 15
- Indiv. wins: 0
- Team starts: 35
- Team podiums: 23
- Team wins: 17
- Overall titles: 0 – (11th in 2002, 2012)
- Discipline titles: 0
Medal record
Women's cross-country skiing
Representing Norway
Olympic Games
Gold medal – first place	2010 Vancouver	4 × 5 km relay
World Championships
Gold medal – first place	2005 Oberstdorf	4 × 5 km relay
Gold medal – first place	2011 Oslo	4 × 5 km relay
Silver medal – second place	2003 Val di Fiemme	4 × 5 km relay
Bronze medal – third place	2007 Sapporo	4 × 5 km relay
Junior World Championships
Bronze medal – third place	2000 Štrbské Pleso	4 × 5 km relay

Vibeke Westbye Skofterud (20 April 1980 – 29 July 2018) was a Norwegian cross-country skier. She won gold in the 4 × 5 km relay at Vancouver in 2010. Her best individual finish at the Winter Olympics was eighth in the 30 km event at Salt Lake City in 2002.

Skofterud won a complete set of 4 × 5 km relay medals at the FIS Nordic World Ski Championships (gold: 2005, gold: 2011, silver: 2003, bronze: 2007) and earned her best individual finish of 13th in the 5 km + 5 km double pursuit in 2003.

Her first individual victory came in a pursuit race in Norway in 2006.

In 2012, Skofterud became the first Norwegian to win the Vasaloppet official ladies class. She set a new record time, 4.08,24, more than 8 minutes faster than the previous record from 1998. This was the first time ever she competed in a race as long as 90 km.

The 2012/2013 World Cup season proved to be difficult for Skofterud, due to illness and injuries, and she was forced to quit the season halfway through. She made a comeback on the national team the following winter. After failing to qualify for the 2014 Winter Olympics, Skofterud announced her retirement from the national team, in favour of a career in ski marathon.

She retired from cross-country skiing in 2015.

== Cross-country skiing results ==
All results are sourced from the International Ski Federation (FIS).

=== Olympic Games ===
- 1 medal – (1 gold)

Year	Age	10 km	15 km	Pursuit	30 km	Sprint	4 × 5 km relay	Team sprint
2002	21	—	28	28	8	21	—	—N/a
2010	29	22	—N/a	DNF	—	—	Gold	—

=== World Championships ===
- 4 medals – (2 gold, 1 silver, 1 bronze)

Year	Age	10 km	15 km	Pursuit	30 km	Sprint	4 × 5 km relay	Team sprint
2001	20	—	—	36	CNX^{[a]}	16	—	—N/a
2003	22	22	—	13	—	—	Silver	—N/a
2005	24	—	—N/a	15	—	37	—	Gold
2007	26	21	—N/a	13	—	33	Bronze	—
2011	30	9	—N/a	—	6	—	Gold	—

a. ^{1} Cancelled due to extremely cold weather.

=== World Cup ===
==== Season standings ====
Season	Age	Discipline standings					Ski Tour standings		
Season	Age	Overall	Distance	Long Distance	Middle Distance	Sprint	Nordic Opening	Tour de Ski	World Cup Final
2000	20	83	—N/a	NC	—	58	—N/a	—N/a	—N/a
2001	21	43	—N/a	—N/a	—N/a	28	—N/a	—N/a	—N/a
2002	22	11	—N/a	—N/a	—N/a	14	—N/a	—N/a	—N/a
2003	23	21	—N/a	—N/a	—N/a	13	—N/a	—N/a	—N/a
2004	24	13	13	—N/a	—N/a	27	—N/a	—N/a	—N/a
2005	25	28	23	—N/a	—N/a	30	—N/a	—N/a	—N/a
2006	26	43	31	—N/a	—N/a	69	—N/a	—N/a	—N/a
2007	27	15	11	—N/a	—N/a	75	—N/a	9	—N/a
2008	28	30	20	—N/a	—N/a	79	—N/a	DNF	—
2009	29	57	37	—N/a	—N/a	—	—N/a	—	—
2010	30	18	12	—N/a	—N/a	59	—N/a	DNF	27
2011	31	27	17	—N/a	—N/a	31	6	—	DNF
2012	32	11	6	—N/a	—N/a	33	3rd place, bronze medalist(s)	—	DNF
2013	33	23	18	—N/a	—N/a	NC	7	—	—
2014	34	56	33	—N/a	—N/a	NC	21	DNF	—

==== Individual podiums ====
- 15 podiums – (12 WC, 3 SWC)

No.	Season	Date	Location	Race	Level	Place
1	2001–02	8 December 2001	Cogne, Italy	5 km Individual C	World Cup	3rd
2	2001–02	9 December 2001	Cogne, Italy	1.5 km Sprint F	World Cup	2nd
3	2001–02	23 March 2002	Birkebeinerrennet, Norway	58 km Mass Start C	World Cup	2nd
4	2003–04	28 November 2003	Rukatunturi, Finland	10 km Individual C	World Cup	2nd
5	2007–08	24 November 2007	Beitostølen, Norway	10 km Individual F	World Cup	2nd
6	2007–08	8 December 2007	Davos, Switzerland	10 km Individual C	World Cup	2nd
7	2009–10	29 November 2009	Rukatunturi, Finland	10 km Individual C	World Cup	3rd
8	2011–12	19 November 2011	Sjusjøen, Norway	10 km Individual F	World Cup	3rd
9	2011–12	25 November 2011	Rukatunturi, Finland	1.2 km Sprint C	Stage World Cup	3rd
10	2011–12	26 November 2011	Rukatunturi, Finland	5 km Individual F	Stage World Cup	2nd
11	2011–12	27 November 2011	Rukatunturi, Finland	10 km Pursuit C	Stage World Cup	3rd
12	2011–12	25–27 November 2011	(Finland) Nordic Opening	Overall Standings	World Cup	3rd
13	2011–12	10 December 2011	Davos, Switzerland	15 km Individual F	World Cup	2nd
14	2011–12	17 December 2011	Rogla, Slovenia	10 km Mass Start C	World Cup	2nd
15	2012–13	16 December 2012	Canmore, Canada	7.5 km + 7.5 km Skiathlon C/F	World Cup	3rd

==== Team podiums ====
- 17 victories – (17 RL)
- 23 podiums – (23 RL)

No.	Season	Date	Location	Race	Level	Place	Teammates
1	2001–02	16 December 2001	Davos, Switzerland	4 × 5 km Relay C/F	World Cup	1st	Bay / Skari / Pedersen
2	2001–02	10 March 2002	Falun, Sweden	4 × 5 km Relay C/F	World Cup	2nd	Moen / Bjørgen / Pedersen
3	2002–03	24 November 2002	Kiruna, Sweden	4 × 5 km Relay C/F	World Cup	1st	Moen / Skari / Sorkmo
4	2002–03	8 December 2002	Davos, Switzerland	4 x 5 km Relay C/F	World Cup	1st	Skari / Pedersen / Sorkmo
5	2003–04	23 November 2003	Beitostølen, Norway	4 × 5 km Relay C/F	World Cup	1st	Pedersen / Steira / Bjørgen
6	2003–04	14 December 2003	Davos, Switzerland	4 × 5 km Relay C/F	World Cup	1st	Bjørgen / Stemland / Pedersen
7	2003–04	11 January 2004	Otepää, Estonia	4 × 5 km Relay C/F	World Cup	1st	Pedersen / Steira / Bjørgen
8	2003–04	22 February 2004	Umeå, Sweden	4 × 5 km Relay C/F	World Cup	1st	Bjørgen / Steira / Pedersen
9	2004–05	24 November 2004	Gällivare, Sweden	4 × 5 km Relay C/F	World Cup	1st	Bjørnås / Pedersen / Bjørgen
10	2004–05	12 December 2004	Val di Fiemme, Italy	4 × 5 km Relay C/F	World Cup	3rd	Bjørnås / Pedersen / Bjørgen
11	2005–06	20 November 2005	Beitostølen, Norway	4 × 5 km Relay C/F	World Cup	1st	Berg / Pedersen / Bjørgen
12	2005–06	15 January 2006	Val di Fiemme, Italy	4 × 5 km Relay C/F	World Cup	3rd	Bjørgen / Stemland / Steira
13	2006–07	19 November 2006	Gällivare, Sweden	4 × 5 km Relay C/F	World Cup	1st	Pedersen / Steira / Bjørgen
14	2006–07	4 February 2007	Davos, Switzerland	4 × 5 km Relay C/F	World Cup	2nd	Jacobsen / Steira / Bjørgen
15	2007–08	25 November 2007	Beitostølen, Norway	4 × 5 km Relay C/F	World Cup	1st	Jacobsen / Johaug / Bjørgen
16	2007–08	9 December 2007	Davos, Switzerland	4 × 5 km Relay C/F	World Cup	1st	Stemland / Johaug / Steira
17	2009–10	22 November 2009	Beitostølen, Norway	4 × 5 km Relay C/F	World Cup	2nd	Johaug / Steira / Bjørgen
18	2010–11	21 November 2010	Gällivare, Sweden	4 × 5 km Relay C/F	World Cup	1st	Johaug / Steira / Bjørgen
19	2010–11	19 December 2010	La Clusaz, France	4 × 5 km Relay C/F	World Cup	1st	Johaug / Steira / Bjørgen
20	2011–12	20 November 2011	Sjusjøen, Norway	4 × 5 km Relay C/F	World Cup	1st	Johaug / Steira / Bjørgen
21	2011–12	12 February 2012	Nové Město, Czech Republic	4 × 5 km Relay C/F	World Cup	1st	Johaug / Jacobsen / Bjørgen
22	2012–13	25 November 2012	Gällivare, Sweden	4 × 5 km Relay C/F	World Cup	1st	Johaug / Hagen / Bjørgen
23	2012–13	20 January 2013	La Clusaz, France	4 × 5 km Relay C/F	World Cup	3rd	Østberg / Hagen / Jacobsen

== Personal life ==
In 2005, Skofterud turned down an offer to appear in the Norwegian edition of the men's magazine FHM. The rejection came after pressure from the Norwegian Ski Federation.

Skofterud suffered from eating disorders, which she claimed as a reason for canceling many competitions in the previous seasons.

Skofterud confirmed in June 2008 that she was in a committed relationship with a woman. She had previously been in relationships with men.

Skofterud was reported missing in the early morning of 29 July 2018 and was found deceased on an islet. The police stated that she most likely died instantly from injuries after a jetski accident near Arendal. Skofterud was under the influence of alcohol at the time of the incident, with a blood alcohol level above the legal limit of 0.8‰. She was 38 years old.
