= 2011 Nordic Opening =

2nd edition of the Nordic Opening

2011–12 FIS Cross-Country World Cup

Ski tour details
- Venue(s): Ruka, Finland
- Dates: 25–27 November
- Stages: 3: Sprint C 5/10 km F 10/15 km C Pursuit

Results
Men
	Winner	Petter Northug (NOR)
	Second	Dario Cologna (SUI)
	Third	Eldar Rønning (NOR)
Women
	Winner	Marit Bjørgen (NOR)
	Second	Therese Johaug (NOR)
	Third	Vibeke Skofterud (NOR)

The 2011 Nordic Opening was the 2nd edition of the Nordic Opening, an annual cross-country skiing event. The three-day event was the second competition round of the 2011–12 FIS Cross-Country World Cup, after Sjusjøen, Norway.

== World Cup points distribution ==
The winners of the overall standings were awarded 200 World Cup points and the winners of each of the three stages were awarded 50 World Cup points.

Nordic Opening Overall
Position	1	2	3	4	5	6	7	8	9	10	11	12	13	14	15	16	17	18	19	20	21	22	23	24	25	26	27	28	29	30
Points	200	160	120	100	90	80	72	64	58	52	48	44	40	36	32	30	28	26	24	22	20	18	16	14	12	10	8	6	4	2

Nordic Overall Stage
Position	1	2	3	4	5	6	7	8	9	10	11	12	13	14	15	16	17	18	19	20	21	22	23	24	25	26	27	28	29	30
Points	50	46	43	40	37	34	32	30	28	26	24	22	20	18	16	15	14	13	12	11	10	9	8	7	6	5	4	3	2	1

A total of 350 points was possible to achieve if one athlete won all three stages and the overall standings.

== Overall standings ==
Men's overall standings (1–10)
Rank	Name	Time
1	Petter Northug (NOR)	1:03:05.1
2	Dario Cologna (SUI)	+1.8
3	Eldar Rønning (NOR)	+20.6
4	Alexey Poltoranin (KAZ)	+22.2
5	Johan Olsson (SWE)	+24.0
6	Marcus Hellner (SWE)	+26.1
7	Alexander Legkov (RUS)	+35.5
8	Maurice Manificat (FRA)	+40.1
9	Lukáš Bauer (CZE)	+43.3
10	Petr Sedov (RUS)	+47.6

Women's overall standings (1–10)
Rank	Name	Time
1	Marit Bjørgen (NOR)	41:36.6
2	Therese Johaug (NOR)	+33.0
3	Vibeke Skofterud (NOR)	+33.7
4	Charlotte Kalla (SWE)	+1:15.7
5	Justyna Kowalczyk (POL)	+2:03.5
6	Kikkan Randall (USA)	+2:18.3
7	Aino-Kaisa Saarinen (FIN)	+2:23.8
8	Anna Haag (SWE)	+2:30.1
9	Marthe Kristoffersen (NOR)	+2:32.7
10	Kristin Størmer Steira (NOR)	+2:36.9

== Overall leadership by stage ==
Overall leadership by stage
Stage	Men		Women	
Stage	Winner	Overall standings	Winner	Overall standings
1	Teodor Peterson	Nikita Kriukov	Marit Bjørgen	Marit Bjørgen
2	Petter Northug	Petter Northug	Marit Bjørgen	Marit Bjørgen
3	Alexey Poltoranin	Petter Northug	Therese Johaug	Marit Bjørgen
Final		Petter Northug	Final	Marit Bjørgen
