= Kine Beate Bjørnås =

Norwegian cross-country skier

Personal information
- Nationality: Norway
- Born: 12 May 1980 (age 46) Levanger, Norway

Sport
- Sport: Skiing
- Club: IL Varden

World Cup career
- Seasons: 8 – (2000–2002, 2004–2008)
- Indiv. starts: 70
- Indiv. podiums: 0
- Team starts: 11
- Team podiums: 3
- Team wins: 1
- Overall titles: 0 – (27th in 2005)
- Discipline titles: 0
Medal record
Women's cross-country skiing
Representing Norway
U23 World Championships
Silver medal – second place	2003 Val di Fiemme	10 km skiathlon
Bronze medal – third place	2003 Val di Fiemme	15 km freestyle
Junior World Championships
Bronze medal – third place	2000 Štrbské Pleso	4 × 5 km relay
- Updated on 26 May 2019

Kine Beate Bjørnås (born 12 May 1980) is a Norwegian former cross-country skier who won a gold medal at the 2005 Norwegian Skiing Championships.

== Personal life ==
Bjørnås is from Meråker Municipality. As a youngster, Bjørnås travelled to Sør-Trøndelag for skiing, as there were too few competitive skiers in Nord-Trøndelag. There she became friends with Marit Bjørgen. She has a bachelor's degree in sports.

== Career ==
Bjørnås joined the Norwegian junior team for the 2001–02 skiing season. Her best result that season was second in the 5 km classical event in Dombås. As a junior, she was described as "one of the most promising Norwegian skiers". She was promoted to the senior team for the 2003 season, but missed the entire season due to a cruciate ligament injury. In the 2003–04 season, her best result was second in the 10 km classical event in Bardufoss.

During the 2004–05 FIS Cross-Country World Cup, Bjørnås and fellow Norwegians Vibeke Skofterud, Hilde Gjermundshaug Pedersen, and Marit Bjørgen won the 4x5km relay race in Gällivare, Sweden. In the same season, the same four came third in the 4 × 5 km relay in Val di Fiemme, Italy. Bjørnås, Pedersen, Kristin Mürer Stemland, and Bjørgen also came second in the 4 × 5 km relay in Falun, Sweden. In 2005, she won the 30 km classical event at the Norwegian Skiing Championships. She came 27th in the Women's sprint event at the FIS Nordic World Ski Championships 2005. Her best individual result at the FIS Cross-Country World Cup was seventh place in the 2006 15 km double staggered start race in Sapporo, Japan.

Bjørnås retired from the sport in 2008, choosing to become a skiing coach in Nord-Trøndelag. She has coached double Olympic champion Petter Northug. The Kinetest, a women's ski trail at the Grovatesten ski field in Meråker Municipality, is named after Bjørnås; the men's trail is slightly longer and is called the Frodetest after Frode Estil.

== Cross-country skiing results ==
All results are sourced from the International Ski Federation (FIS).

=== World Championships ===
Year	Age	10 km individual	15 km skiathlon	30 km mass start	Sprint	4 × 5 km relay	Team sprint
2005	24	25	—	30	27	—	—

=== World Cup ===
==== Season standings ====
Season	Age	Discipline standings					Ski Tour standings	
Season	Age	Overall	Distance	Long Distance	Middle Distance	Sprint	Tour de Ski	World Cup Final
2000	19	NC	—N/a	NC	—	NC	—N/a	—N/a
2001	20	83	—N/a	—N/a	—N/a	NC	—N/a	—N/a
2002	21	65	—N/a	—N/a	—N/a	57	—N/a	—N/a
2004	23	39	30	—N/a	—N/a	31	—N/a	—N/a
2005	24	27	19	—N/a	—N/a	38	—N/a	—N/a
2006	25	51	35	—N/a	—N/a	NC	—N/a	—N/a
2007	26	57	NC	—N/a	—N/a	NC	17	—N/a
2008	27	NC	NC	—N/a	—N/a	—	—	—

==== Team podiums ====
- 1 victory – (1 RL)
- 3 podiums – (3 RL)

No.	Season	Date	Location	Race	Level	Place	Teammates
1	2004–05	24 November 2004	Gällivare, Sweden	4 × 5 km Relay C/F	World Cup	1st	Skofterud / Pedersen / Bjørgen
2	2004–05	12 December 2004	Val di Fiemme, Italy	4 × 5 km Relay C/F	World Cup	3rd	Skofterud / Pedersen / Bjørgen
3	2004–05	20 March 2005	Falun, Sweden	4 × 5 km Relay C/F	World Cup	2nd	Pedersen / Stemland / Bjørgen
