= Kristin Størmer Steira =

Norwegian cross-country skier (born 1981)

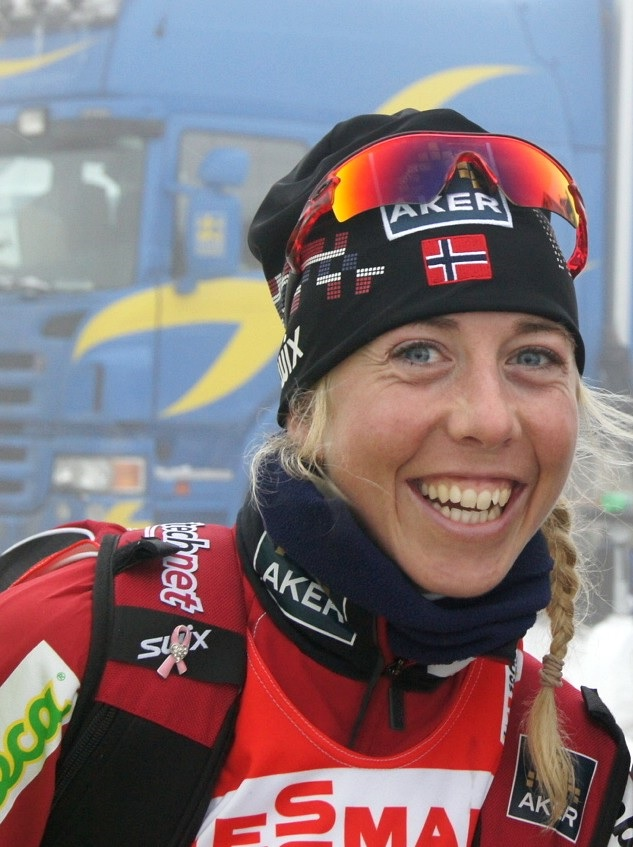
- Kristin Størmer Steira in Poland, 2012

Personal information
- Full name: Kristin Størmer Steira
- Nationality: Norway
- Born: 30 April 1981 (age 45) Mo i Rana, Norway
- Height: 169 cm (5 ft 7 in)
- Spouse: Devon Kershaw

Sport
- Sport: Skiing
- Club: IL Forsøk

World Cup career
- Seasons: 14 – (2002–2015)
- Indiv. starts: 181
- Indiv. podiums: 22
- Indiv. wins: 6
- Team starts: 27
- Team podiums: 18
- Team wins: 13
- Overall titles: 0 – (6th in 2010, 2013)
- Discipline titles: 0
Medal record
Women's cross-country skiing
Representing Norway
Olympic Games
| Gold medal – first place | 2010 Vancouver | 4 × 5 km relay |
| Bronze medal – third place | 2014 Sochi | 30 km freestyle |
World Championships
| Gold medal – first place | 2005 Oberstdorf | 4 × 5 km relay |
| Gold medal – first place | 2011 Oslo | 4 × 5 km relay |
| Gold medal – first place | 2013 Val di Fiemme | 4 × 5 km relay |
| Silver medal – second place | 2007 Sapporo | 30 km classical |
| Silver medal – second place | 2009 Liberec | 15 km skiathlon |
| Bronze medal – third place | 2005 Oberstdorf | 15 km skiathlon |
| Bronze medal – third place | 2007 Sapporo | 15 km skiathlon |
| Bronze medal – third place | 2007 Sapporo | 4 × 5 km relay |
U23 World Championships
| Silver medal – second place | 2003 Valdidentro | 15 km classical |
| Silver medal – second place | 2003 Valdidentro | 10 km double pursuit |

Kristin Størmer Steira (born 30 April 1981) is a retired Norwegian cross-country skier. She competed from 2002 to 2015, and won six individual World Cup victories and five individual medals at the FIS Nordic World Ski Championships and Winter Olympic Games. She also won four gold medals with the Norway relay team. In Norwegian media, Steira was dubbed "the eternal fourth" due to her many finishes in fourth place.

== Career ==
At the FIS Nordic World Ski Championships, she has seven medals with two gold (4 × 5 km relay: 2005, 2011), two silvers (7.5 km + 7.5 km double pursuit: 2009, 30 km: 2007), and three bronzes (7.5 km + 7,5 km double pursuit: 2005, 2007; 4 × 5 km relay: 2007).

Steira finished fourth in three individual events (10 km, 7.5 km + 7.5 km double pursuit, 30 km) at the 2006 Winter Olympics in Turin. She has four individual career victories at various levels from 2002 to 2006. In 2009 Steira extended her interests to track athletics and announced her ambition to compete in the 5000 metres at the 2010 European Athletics Championships after achieving a time of 16.02 in Norway. She never did.

In the 2010 Winter Olympics in Vancouver, she came eighth in the 10 km pursuit. More agonisingly, she achieved her fourth fourth-place Olympic finish in the 15 km pursuit, losing out on a medal by 0.1 seconds in a photo finish with Justyna Kowalczyk. This, along with her many fourth places previously, led to Norwegian media jokingly labelling her as "the eternal fourth". On 25 February 2010 Steira became an Olympic champion in the 4 × 5 km relay, racing in the third leg after Vibeke Skofterud and Therese Johaug and before Marit Bjørgen.

She qualified for the 2014 Winter Olympics in Sochi, where she became 23rd in 15 kilometre skiathlon. In the last event, 30 km mass start freestyle, she finally won the bronze, her only individual medal of the Winter Olympics.

On 20 April 2015, Steira announced her retirement from professional skiing.

== Cross-country skiing results ==
All results are sourced from the International Ski Federation (FIS).

=== Olympic Games ===
- 2 medals – (1 gold, 1 bronze)

| Year | Age | 10 km individual | 15 km skiathlon | 30 km mass start | Sprint | 4 × 5 km relay | Team sprint |
|---|---|---|---|---|---|---|---|
| 2006 | 24 | 4 | 4 | 4 | — | 5 | — |
| 2010 | 28 | 8 | 4 | 8 | — | Gold | — |
| 2014 | 32 | — | 22 | Bronze | — | — | — |

=== World Championships ===
- 8 medals – (3 gold, 2 silver, 3 bronze)

| Year | Age | 10 km | 15 km | Pursuit | 30 km | Sprint | 4 × 5 km relay | Team sprint |
|---|---|---|---|---|---|---|---|---|
| 2003 | 21 | — | — | 28 | 25 | — | — | —N/a |
| 2005 | 23 | 9 | —N/a | Bronze | — | — | Gold | — |
| 2007 | 25 | 4 | —N/a | Bronze | Silver | — | Bronze | — |
| 2009 | 27 | 6 | —N/a | Silver | 5 | — | 4 | — |
| 2011 | 29 | 10 | —N/a | 9 | 5 | — | Gold | — |
| 2013 | 31 | 9 | —N/a | 4 | 9 | — | Gold | — |

=== World Cup ===
==== Season standings ====
| Season | Age | Discipline standings | | | Ski Tour standings | | |
| Season | Age | Overall | Distance | Sprint | Nordic Opening | Tour de Ski | World Cup Final |
|---|---|---|---|---|---|---|---|
| 2002 | 20 | NC | —N/a | — | —N/a | —N/a | —N/a |
| 2003 | 21 | 42 | —N/a | NC | —N/a | —N/a | —N/a |
| 2004 | 22 | 27 | 20 | — | —N/a | —N/a | —N/a |
| 2005 | 23 | 12 | 9 | — | —N/a | —N/a | —N/a |
| 2006 | 24 | 22 | 12 | — | —N/a | —N/a | —N/a |
| 2007 | 25 | 14 | 12 | NC | —N/a | 7 | —N/a |
| 2008 | 26 | 16 | 12 | NC | —N/a | 11 | 15 |
| 2009 | 27 | 9 | 4 | 53 | —N/a | 9 | 4 |
| 2010 | 28 | 6 | 3rd place, bronze medalist(s) | 49 | —N/a | 5 | 4 |
| 2011 | 29 | 28 | 19 | NC | — | — | 8 |
| 2012 | 30 | 14 | 9 | NC | 10 | DNF | 6 |
| 2013 | 31 | 6 | 3rd place, bronze medalist(s) | 45 | 8 | 3rd place, bronze medalist(s) | 25 |
| 2014 | 32 | 19 | 11 | NC | 14 | DNF | 9 |
| 2015 | 33 | 53 | 33 | — | — | — | —N/a |

==== Individual podiums ====
- 6 victories – (3 SWC, 3 SWC)
- 22 podiums – (10 WC, 12 SWC)

| No. | Season | Date | Location | Race | Level | Place |
|---|---|---|---|---|---|---|
| 1 | 2004–05 | 18 December 2004 | Ramsau, Austria | 15 km Mass Start F | World Cup | 2nd |
| 2 | 2004–05 | 22 January 2005 | Pragelato, Italy | 7.5 km + 7.5 km Pursuit C/F | World Cup | 1st |
| 3 | 2005–06 | 19 March 2006 | Sapporo, Japan | 7.5 km + 7.5 km Pursuit C/F | World Cup | 2nd |
| 4 | 2006–07 | 2 January 2007 | Oberstdorf, Germany | 5 km + 5 km Pursuit C/F | Stage World Cup | 1st |
| 5 | 2006–07 | 3 January 2007 | Oberstdorf, Germany | 10 km Individual C | Stage World Cup | 2nd |
| 6 | 2006–07 | 3 January 2007 | Cavalese, Italy | 10 km Individual F | Stage World Cup | 2nd |
| 7 | 2007–08 | 8 December 2007 | Davos, Switzerland | 10 km Individual C | World Cup | 3rd |
| 8 | 2007–08 | 1 January 2008 | Nové Město, Czech Republic | 10 km Pursuit F | Stage World Cup | 2nd |
| 9 | 2007–08 | 6 January 2008 | Val di Fiemme, Italy | 9 km Pursuit F | Stage World Cup | 2nd |
| 10 | 2008–09 | 6 December 2008 | La Clusaz, France | 15 km Mass Start F | World Cup | 1st |
| 11 | 2008–09 | 4 January 2009 | Val di Fiemme, Italy | 9 km Pursuit F | Stage World Cup | 2nd |
| 12 | 2008–09 | 22 March 2009 | Falun, Sweden | 10 km Pursuit F | Stage World Cup | 1st |
| 13 | 2009–10 | 2 January 2010 | Oberhof, Germany | 10 km Pursuit C | Stage World Cup | 3rd |
| 14 | 2009–10 | 10 January 2010 | Val di Fiemme, Italy | 9 km Pursuit F | Stage World Cup | 1st |
| 15 | 2009–10 | 13 March 2010 | Oslo, Norway | 30 km Mass Start F | World Cup | 2nd |
| 16 | 2009–10 | 20 March 2010 | Falun, Sweden | 5 km + 5 km Pursuit C/F | Stage World Cup | 2nd |
| 17 | 2009–10 | 21 March 2010 | Falun, Sweden | 10 km Pursuit F | Stage World Cup | 2nd |
| 18 | 2010–11 | 18 December 2010 | La Clusaz, France | 15 km Mass Start F | World Cup | 3rd |
| 19 | 2012–13 | 5 January 2013 | Val di Fiemme, Italy | 10 km Mass Start C | Stage World Cup | 2nd |
| 20 | 2012–13 | 29 December 2012 – 6 January 2013 | (Germany) (Switzerland) (Italy) Tour de Ski | Overall Standings | World Cup | 3rd |
| 21 | 2012–13 | 2 February 2013 | Sochi, Russia | 7.5 km + 7.5 km Skiathlon C/F | World Cup | 1st |
| 22 | 2012–13 | 17 February 2013 | Davos, Switzerland | 10 km Individual F | World Cup | 3rd |

==== Team podiums ====
- 13 victories – (13 RL)
- 18 podiums – (18 RL)

| No. | Season | Date | Location | Race | Level | Place | Teammates |
|---|---|---|---|---|---|---|---|
| 1 | 2002–03 | 19 January 2003 | Nové Město, Czech Republic | 4 × 5 km Relay C/F | World Cup | 2nd | Moen / Bjørgen / Pedersen |
| 2 | 2002–03 | 23 March 2003 | Falun, Sweden | 4 × 5 km Relay C/F | World Cup | 2nd | Moen / Pedersen / Skari |
| 3 | 2003–04 | 23 November 2003 | Beitostølen, Norway | 4 × 5 km Relay C/F | World Cup | 1st | Skofterud / Pedersen / Bjørgen |
| 4 | 2003–04 | 11 January 2004 | Otepää, Estonia | 4 × 5 km Relay C/F | World Cup | 1st | Skofterud / Pedersen / Bjørgen |
| 5 | 2003–04 | 22 February 2004 | Umeå, Sweden | 4 × 5 km Relay C/F | World Cup | 1st | Skofterud / Bjørgen / Pedersen |
| 6 | 2006–07 | 19 November 2006 | Gällivare, Sweden | 4 × 5 km Relay C/F | World Cup | 1st | Skofterud / Pedersen / Bjørgen |
| 7 | 2006–07 | 4 February 2007 | Davos, Switzerland | 4 × 5 km Relay C/F | World Cup | 2nd | Jacobsen / Skofterud / Bjørgen |
| 8 | 2007–08 | 9 December 2007 | Davos, Switzerland | 4 × 5 km Relay C/F | World Cup | 1st | Stemland / Johaug / Skofterud |
| 9 | 2007–08 | 24 February 2008 | Falun, Sweden | 4 × 5 km Relay C/F | World Cup | 1st | Tyldum / Jacobsen / Bjørgen |
| 10 | 2008–09 | 23 November 2008 | Gällivare, Sweden | 4 × 5 km Relay C/F | World Cup | 1st | Bjørgen / Johaug / Kristoffersen |
| 11 | 2008–09 | 7 December 2008 | La Clusaz, France | 4 × 5 km Relay C/F | World Cup | 3rd | Stemland / Johaug / Nilsen |
| 12 | 2009–10 | 22 November 2009 | Beitostølen, Norway | 4 × 5 km Relay C/F | World Cup | 2nd | Skofterud / Johaug / Bjørgen |
| 13 | 2009–10 | 7 March 2010 | Lahti, Finland | 4 × 5 km Relay C/F | World Cup | 1st | Kristoffersen / Johaug / Bjørgen |
| 14 | 2010–11 | 21 November 2010 | Gällivare, Sweden | 4 × 5 km Relay C/F | World Cup | 1st | Skofterud / Johaug / Bjørgen |
| 15 | 2010–11 | 19 December 2010 | La Clusaz, France | 4 × 5 km Relay C/F | World Cup | 1st | Skofterud / Johaug / Bjørgen |
| 16 | 2011–12 | 21 November 2011 | Sjusjøen, Norway | 4 × 5 km Relay C/F | World Cup | 1st | Skofterud / Johaug / Bjørgen |
| 17 | 2012–13 | 20 January 2013 | La Clusaz, France | 4 × 5 km Relay C/F | World Cup | 1st | Weng / Johaug / Bjørgen |
| 18 | 2013–14 | 8 December 2013 | Lillehammer, Norway | 4 × 5 km Relay C/F | World Cup | 1st | Weng / Johaug / Bjørgen |

== Personal life ==
Steira lives in Drøbak, near Oslo, in Norway. She married Canadian skier Devon Kershaw, her boyfriend since December 2012, on 25 July 2015.
