= Kristin Mürer Stemland =

Norwegian cross-country skier

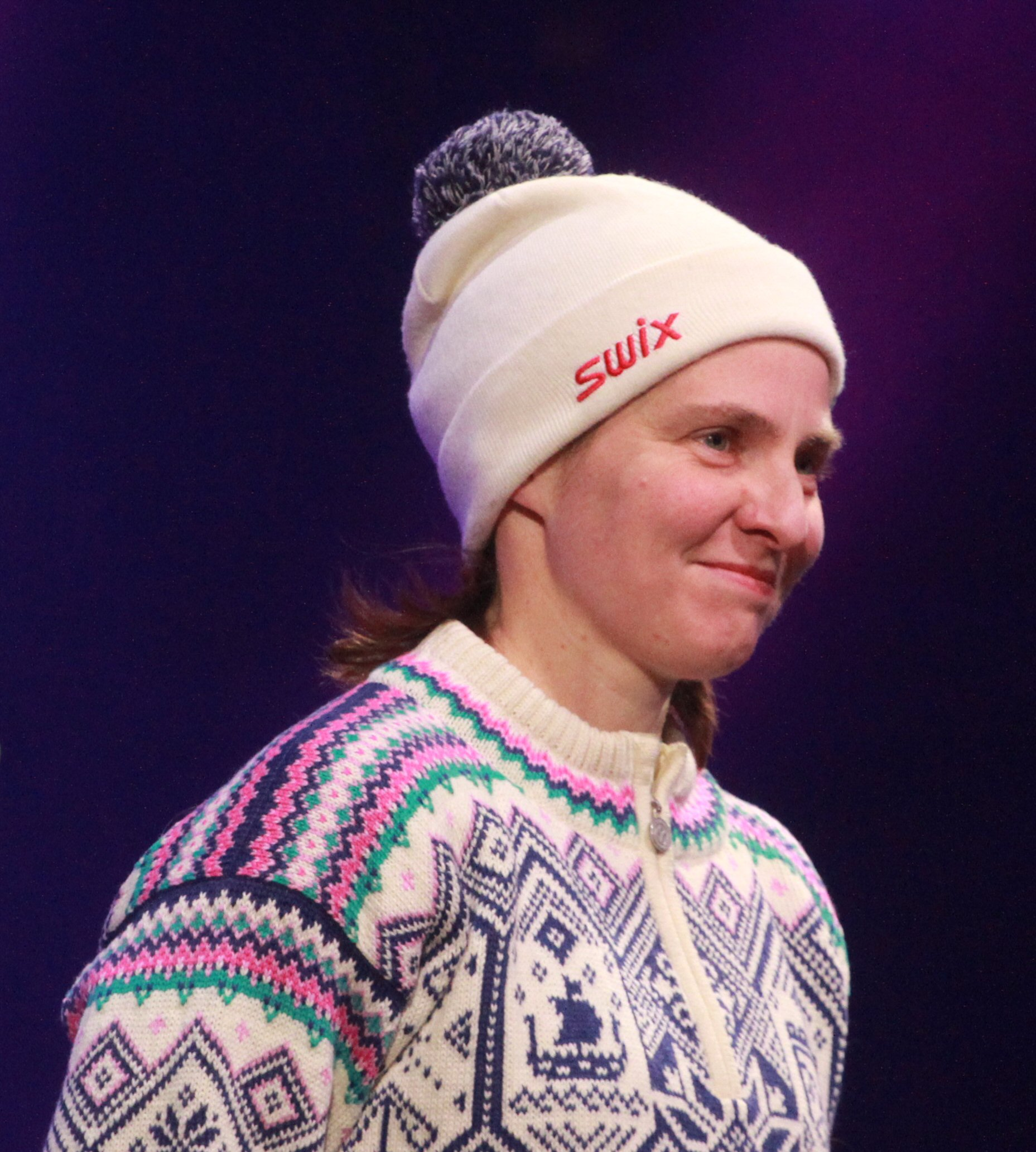

Personal information
- Nationality: Norway
- Born: 8 January 1981 (age 45) Trondheim, Norway

Sport
- Sport: Skiing
- Club: Byåsen IL

World Cup career
- Seasons: 8 – (2000, 2004–2010)
- Indiv. starts: 78
- Indiv. podiums: 0
- Team starts: 17
- Team podiums: 4
- Team wins: 2
- Overall titles: 0 – (24th in 2004)
- Discipline titles: 0
Medal record
Women's cross-country skiing
Representing Norway
U23 World Championships
Bronze medal – third place	2003 Valdidentro	15 km classical

Kristin Mürer Stemland (born 8 January 1981) is a Norwegian cross-country skier.

Born in Trondheim, her club is Byåsen IL.

At the 2006 Winter Olympics in Turin, Stemland finished 5th in women's 4 × 5 km relay with the Norwegian team. She participated at the 2007-08 Cross-country Skiing World Cup, and won one of the relays.

== Cross-country skiing results ==
All results are sourced from the International Ski Federation (FIS).

=== Olympic Games ===
Year	Age	10 km individual	15 km skiathlon	30 km mass start	Sprint	4 × 5 km relay	Team sprint
2006	25	12	19	24	—	5	—

=== World Championships ===
Year	Age	10 km individual	15 km skiathlon	30 km mass start	Sprint	4 × 5 km relay	Team sprint
2005	24	22	19	—	—	—	—
2007	26	19	—	—	—	—	—

=== World Cup ===
==== Season standings ====
Season	Age	Discipline standings					Ski Tour standings	
Season	Age	Overall	Distance	Long Distance	Middle Distance	Sprint	Tour de Ski	World Cup Final
2000	19	NC	—N/a	—	—	NC	—N/a	—N/a
2004	23	24	17	—N/a	—N/a	—	—N/a	—N/a
2005	24	49	31	—N/a	—N/a	NC	—N/a	—N/a
2006	25	31	20	—N/a	—N/a	NC	—N/a	—N/a
2007	26	46	30	—N/a	—N/a	NC	28	—N/a
2008	27	33	27	—N/a	—N/a	54	26	28
2009	28	94	65	—N/a	—N/a	—	—	—
2010	29	115	89	—N/a	—N/a	—	—	—

==== Team podiums ====
- 2 victories
- 4 podiums

No.	Season	Date	Location	Race	Level	Place	Teammates
1	2003–04	14 December 2003	Davos, Switzerland	4 × 5 km Relay C/F	World Cup	1st	Skofterud / Bjørgen / Pedersen
2	2004–05	20 March 2005	Falun, Sweden	4 × 5 km Relay C/F	World Cup	2nd	Bjørnås / Pedersen / Bjørgen
3	2007–08	9 December 2007	Davos, Switzerland	4 × 5 km Relay C/F	World Cup	1st	Johaug / Steira / Skofterud
4	2008–09	7 December 2008	La Clusaz, France	4 × 5 km Relay C/F	World Cup	3rd	Johaug / Nilsen / Steira
