= Betty Ann Bjerkreim Nilsen =

Norwegian orienteer (born 1986)

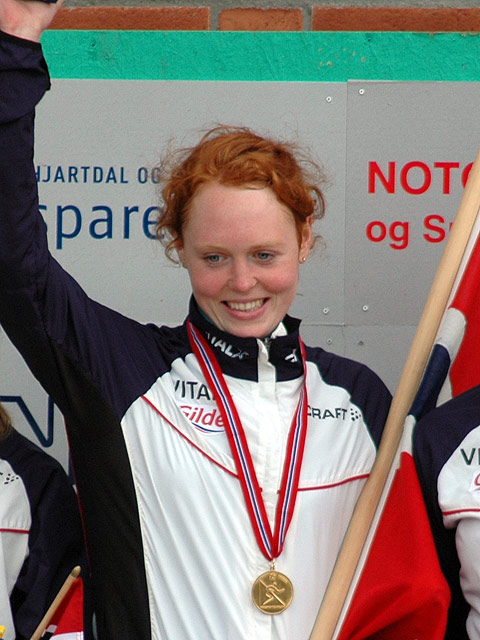

Personal information
- Nationality: Norway
- Born: 7 September 1986 (age 39) Kristiansand, Norway

Sport
- Sport: Skiing
- Club: Bækkelagets SK

World Cup career
- Seasons: 3 – (2007–2009)
- Indiv. starts: 12
- Indiv. podiums: 0
- Team starts: 2
- Team podiums: 1
- Team wins: 0
- Overall titles: 0 – (54th in 2007)
- Discipline titles: 0
Medal record
Women's cross-country skiing
Representing Norway
U23 World Championships
| Silver medal – second place | 2009 Praz de Lys-Sommand | 10 km freestyle |
Junior World Championships
| Gold medal – first place | 2005 Rovaniemi | 4 × 5 km relay |
| Gold medal – first place | 2006 Kranj | 4 × 3.33 km relay |
| Silver medal – second place | 2006 Kranj | 10 km skiathlon |
| Bronze medal – third place | 2005 Rovaniemi | 10 km skiathlon |
| Bronze medal – third place | 2005 Rovaniemi | 5 km freestyle |
Women's orienteering
Representing Norway
World Championships
| Gold medal – first place | 2009 Miskolc | Relay |
Junior World Championships
| Gold medal – first place | 2005 Tenero | Relay |
| Gold medal – first place | 2006 Druskininkai | Middle |
| Silver medal – second place | 2006 Druskininkai | Long |
| Bronze medal – third place | 2003 Põlva | Relay |
| Bronze medal – third place | 2004 Gdańsk | Relay |

Betty Ann Bjerkreim Nilsen (born 7 September 1986) is a Norwegian orienteering competitor and cross-country skier. She was a junior World Champion in both sports. At senior level she has won a gold medal in relay at the World Orienteering Championships.

== Orienteering ==
Bjerkreim Nilsen won a gold medal in the relay at the 2005 Junior World Orienteering Championships. In 2006, she received an individual gold medal in the middle distance, and a silver medal in the short course. She participated in the 2007 World Cup, where her best single result was a fifth in the sprint distance at O-Ringen. At the 2009 World Orienteering Championships in Miskolc she won a gold medal in the relay, together with Anne Margrethe Hausken and Marianne Andersen.

== Cross-country skiing ==
She received a gold medal in the relay at the 2005 Junior World Championships in cross-country skiing, and again in 2006. She debuted in the senior world cup in November 2006, and competed in the World Championships in Sapporo in 2007.

== Cross-country skiing results ==
All results are sourced from the International Ski Federation (FIS).

=== World Championships ===
| Year | Age | 10 km individual | 15 km skiathlon | 30 km mass start | Sprint | 4 × 5 km relay | Team sprint |
|---|---|---|---|---|---|---|---|
| 2007 | 20 | — | 20 | DNF | — | — | — |

=== World Cup ===
==== Season standings ====
| Season | Age | Discipline standings | | | Ski Tour standings | |
| Season | Age | Overall | Distance | Sprint | Tour de Ski | World Cup Final |
|---|---|---|---|---|---|---|
| 2007 | 20 | 54 | 43 | NC | 24 | —N/a |
| 2008 | 21 | NC | NC | — | — | — |
| 2009 | 22 | 83 | 54 | NC | — | DNF |

==== Team podiums ====
- 1 podium

| No. | Season | Date | Location | Race | Level | Place | Teammates |
|---|---|---|---|---|---|---|---|
| 1 | 2008–09 | 7 December 2008 | La Clusaz, France | 4 × 5 km Relay C/F | World Cup | 3rd | Stemland / Johaug / Steira |
