= Børre Næss =

Norwegian cross-country skier

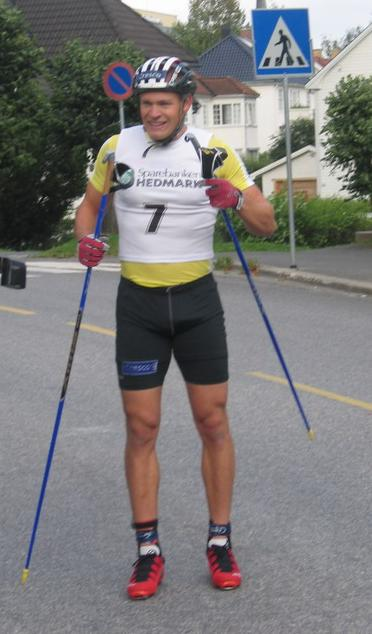

Personal information
- Nationality: Norway
- Born: 23 January 1982 (age 44) Kongsberg, Norway

Sport
- Sport: Skiing
- Club: Ringkollen SK

World Cup career
- Seasons: 9 – (2003–2011)
- Indiv. starts: 46
- Indiv. podiums: 9
- Indiv. wins: 3
- Team starts: 2
- Team podiums: 1
- Team wins: 0
- Overall titles: 0 – (19th in 2005)
- Discipline titles: 0
Medal record
Men's cross-country skiing
Representing Norway
U23 World Championships
Gold medal – first place	2004 Park City	Team sprint
Silver medal – second place	2004 Park City	Individual sprint

Børre Næss (born 23 January 1982 in Kongsberg) is a Norwegian cross-country skier who competed between 2002 and 2014. He has three World Cup victories, all in individual sprint events (2005: Finland, 2007: Norway, 2008: Canada).

== Cross-country skiing results ==
All results are sourced from the International Ski Federation (FIS).

=== World Cup ===
==== Season standings ====
Season	Age	Discipline standings			Ski Tour standings		
Season	Age	Overall	Distance	Sprint	Nordic Opening	Tour de Ski	World Cup Final
2003	21	NC	—N/a	—	—N/a	—N/a	—N/a
2004	22	52	—	18	—N/a	—N/a	—N/a
2005	23	19	—	5	—N/a	—N/a	—N/a
2006	24	32	—	15	—N/a	—N/a	—N/a
2007	25	24	—	7	—N/a	—	—N/a
2008	26	31	—	9	—N/a	—	—
2009	27	70	—	33	—N/a	—	—
2010	28	179	—	111	—N/a	—	—
2011	29	NC	NC	—	—	—	—

==== Individual podiums ====
- 3 victories – (3 WC)
- 9 podiums – (9 WC)

No.	Season	Date	Location	Race	Level	Place
1	2003–04	12 March 2004	Pragelato, Italy	1.3 km Sprint F	World Cup	3rd
2	2004–05	5 March 2005	Lahti, Finland	1.4 km Sprint C	World Cup	1st
3	2004–05	9 March 2005	Drammen, Norway	1.2 km Sprint C	World Cup	3rd
4	2005–06	9 March 2006	Drammen, Norway	1.2 km Sprint C	World Cup	2nd
5	2006–07	15 February 2007	Changchun, China	1.3 km Sprint C	World Cup	2nd
6	2006–07	14 March 2007	Drammen, Norway	1.2 km Sprint C	World Cup	1st
7	2007–08	23 January 2008	Canmore, Canada	1.2 km Sprint C	World Cup	1st
8	2007–08	27 February 2008	Stockholm, Sweden	1.0 km Sprint C	World Cup	2nd
9	2008–09	25 January 2009	Otepää, Estonia	1.4 km Sprint C	World Cup	3rd

==== Team podiums ====
- 1 podium – (1 TS)

No.	Season	Date	Location	Race	Level	Place	Teammate
1	2004–05	15 December 2004	Asiago, Italy	6 × 1.2 km Team Sprint C	World Cup	3rd	Iversen
