= Ella Gjømle Berg =

Norwegian cross-country skier

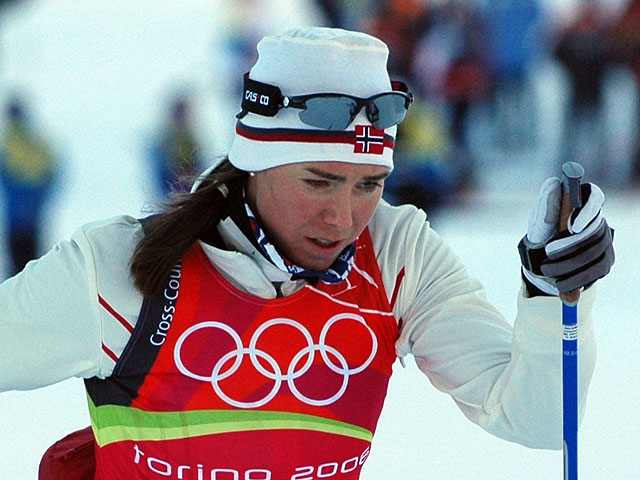
- Ella Gjømle in 2006

Personal information
- Nationality: Norway
- Born: 29 May 1979 (age 47) Stathelle, Norway

Sport
- Sport: Skiing
- Club: SFK Lyn

World Cup career
- Seasons: 12 – (2000–2011)
- Indiv. starts: 90
- Indiv. podiums: 7
- Indiv. wins: 1
- Team starts: 17
- Team podiums: 5
- Team wins: 4
- Overall titles: 0 – (11th in 2006)
- Discipline titles: 0

Ella Gjømle Berg (born 29 May 1979) is a cross-country skier from Stathelle in Bamble Municipality, Norway. She competes for Lyn Ski Club, Oslo.

== Career ==
Gjømle Berg competed in the 2005 World Championship in Oberstdorf, finishing ninth in the sprint competition. She finished fourth in team sprint at the 2006 Olympics in Torino, and sixth in the individual sprint.

Gjømle Berg finished second in the 2005-06 Sprint World Cup.

She obtained one victory (team sprint with Marit Bjørgen, Düsseldorf) and one third place (sprint, Düsseldorf) during the 2006-07 Cross-Country Skiing World Cup.

She is a three-time Norwegian champion.

== Cross-country skiing results ==
All results are sourced from the International Ski Federation (FIS).

=== Olympic Games ===
Year	Age	10 km individual	15 km skiathlon	30 km mass start	Sprint	4 × 5 km relay	Team sprint
2006	26	—	—	29	6	—	4

=== World Championships ===
Year	Age	10 km individual	15 km skiathlon	30 km mass start	Sprint	4 × 5 km relay	Team sprint
2005	25	—	—	36	9	—	—
2007	27	—	—	—	21	—	—

=== World Cup ===
==== Season standings ====
Season	Age	Discipline standings					Ski Tour standings		
Season	Age	Overall	Distance	Long Distance	Middle Distance	Sprint	Nordic Opening	Tour de Ski	World Cup Final
2000	20	NC	—N/a	NC	NC	NC	—N/a	—N/a	—N/a
2001	21	NC	—N/a	—N/a	—N/a	NC	—N/a	—N/a	—N/a
2002	22	NC	—N/a	—N/a	—N/a	NC	—N/a	—N/a	—N/a
2003	23	81	—N/a	—N/a	—N/a	62	—N/a	—N/a	—N/a
2004	24	38	56	—N/a	—N/a	18	—N/a	—N/a	—N/a
2005	25	23	55	—N/a	—N/a	8	—N/a	—N/a	—N/a
2006	26	11	45	—N/a	—N/a	2nd place, silver medalist(s)	—N/a	—N/a	—N/a
2007	27	26	36	—N/a	—N/a	13	—N/a	—	—N/a
2008	28	58	NC	—N/a	—N/a	40	—N/a	—	—
2009	29	122	NC	—N/a	—N/a	82	—N/a	—	—
2010	30	NC	—	—N/a	—N/a	NC	—N/a	—	—
2011	31	NC	NC	—N/a	—N/a	NC	—	—	—

==== Individual podiums ====
- 1 victory
- 7 podiums

No.	Season	Date	Location	Race	Level	Place
1	2003–04	18 February 2004	Stockholm, Sweden	1.1 km Sprint C	World Cup	3rd
2	2004–05	4 December 2004	Bern, Switzerland	0.8 km Sprint F	World Cup	3rd
3	2004–05	14 December 2004	Asiago, Italy	1.2 km Sprint C	World Cup	3rd
4	2005–06	8 January 2006	Otepää, Estonia	1.0 km Sprint C	World Cup	3rd
5	2005–06	22 January 2006	Oberstdorf, Germany	0.9 km Sprint C	World Cup	1st
6	2005–06	15 March 2006	Changchun, China	1.0 km Sprint F	World Cup	3rd
7	2006–07	28 October 2006	Düsseldorf, Germany	0.8 km Sprint F	World Cup	3rd

==== Team podiums ====
- 4 victories – (1 RL, 3 TS)
- 5 podiums – (1 RL, 4 TS)

No.	Season	Date	Location	Race	Level	Place	Teammate(s)
1	2004–05	5 December 2004	Bern, Switzerland	6 × 1.1 km Team Sprint F	World Cup	1st	Bjørgen
2	2004–05	15 December 2004	Asiago, Italy	6 × 1.2 km Team Sprint C	World Cup	1st	Bjørgen
3	2005–06	23 October 2005	Düsseldorf, Germany	6 × 0.8 km Team Sprint F	World Cup	2nd	Solli
4	2005–06	20 November 2005	Beitostølen, Norway	4 × 5 km Relay C/F	World Cup	1st	Skofterud / Pedersen / Bjørgen
5	2006–07	29 October 2006	Düsseldorf, Germany	6 × 0.8 km Team Sprint F	World Cup	1st	Bjørgen
