= Gällivare =

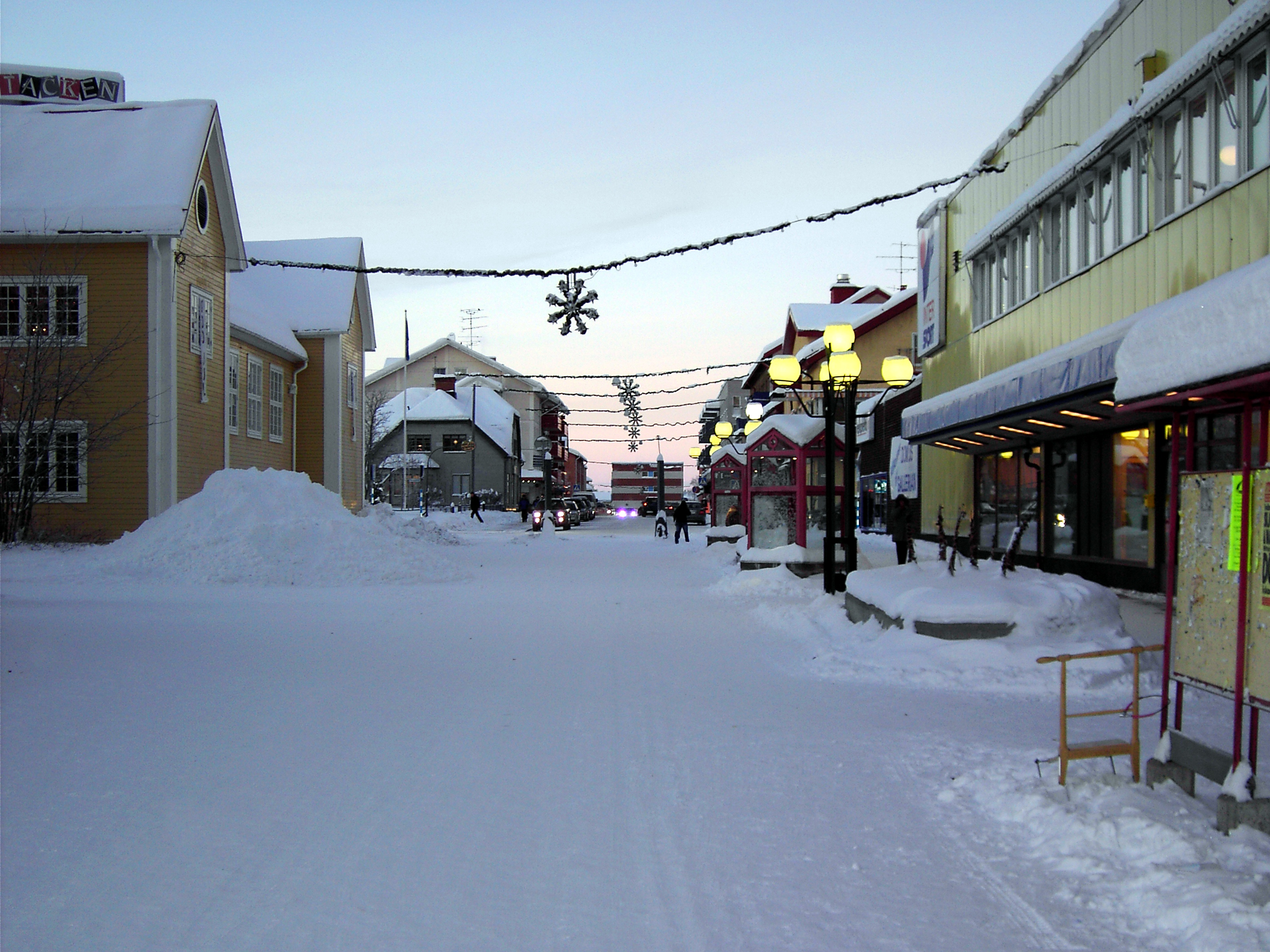
- The main street (Storgatan) with snow and Christmas lights in Gällivare at about noon in December 2005.

- Location within Norrbotten Location within Sweden
- Coordinates: 67.130°N 20.66°E
- Country: Sweden
- Province: Lapland
- County: Norrbotten County
- Municipality: Gällivare Municipality

Area
  - Total: 7.48 km^{2} (2.89 sq mi)

Population (31 December 2010)
  - Total: 8,449
  - Density: 1,130/km^{2} (2,900/sq mi)
- Time zone: UTC+1 (CET)
  - Summer (DST): UTC+2 (CEST)

Gällivare (Swedish: [ˈjɛ̌lːɪvɑːrɛ]; Finnish: Jällivaara; Northern Sami: Jiellevárri or Váhčir; Lule Sami: Jiellevárre or Váhtjer; Meänkieli: Jellivaara) is a locality and the seat of Gällivare Municipality in Norrbotten County, province of Lapland, Sweden with 8,449 inhabitants in 2010. The town was founded in the 17th century. Together with nearby towns Malmberget and Koskullskulle it forms a conurbation with some 15,000 inhabitants.

Gällivare is situated at the northern end of the Inlandsbanan railway line, about 60 kilometres north of the Arctic Circle. Gällivare is located in a major iron ore mining region. Adjacent to Gällivare (about five kilometres) is Malmberget, known as a site for iron ore extraction from deep mines by LKAB. In addition Aitik, one of Europe's largest open pit copper mines, is operated just twenty kilometers away by Boliden AB.

Outside Gällivare lies the ski resort Dundret, which is equipped with six ski lifts and ten groomed slopes along with a conference center and hotel. The ski season stretches from the end of October all the way into early May. The town has been host for several World Cup skiing events, both alpine and cross-country. Around the town roughly 130km (13 Swedish miles) of Nordic skiing tracks are maintained and freely accessible.

Gällivare is the center of the Firstborn Laestadian movement.

It was the host town for the 2008 VIVA World Cup and also the filming spot for Avicii's single "Addicted to You". Sweden's second-largest fast food chain, Max Hamburgers, was founded in Gällivare, though the headquarters have since relocated to Luleå.

== History ==
Gällivare's history as a settlement dates back to the 1690s, when iron ore was discovered in the mountain Illuvare, which came to be known as Gällivare malmberg. The find was located in what is now Malmberget, where test mining began in 1735. At that time, the population in the area was largely composed of Sámi belonging to the Kaitum Sámi community. Since 1605, they had had their church in Jokkmokk, but in the early 18th century, the Swedish parliament received rumors that they had not yet been fully Christianized.

In 1738, the parliament therefore decided that a new church should be established closer to the Kaitum Sámi, with each household in Sweden contributing one öre silver coin. In 1742, missionaries Pehr Högström and Petrus Holmbom traveled around Kaitum and, together with the Sámi, decided that Easter should be celebrated near Gällivare malmberg. There, they also placed the church that was built two years later from the collected coins, Ettöreskyrkan (Gällivare Old Church).

In connection with the church, Gällivare developed as a settlement in tandem with the commercial extraction of ore in Malmberget, which began in the 1740s. The major boost came with the construction of the Malmbanan railway in the late 19th century, which greatly facilitated ore transportation. In 1910, a hospital was also established in Gällivare.

== Climate ==
As expected given its high latitude, Gällivare has a rather cold climate. Under the Köppen climate classification it is a subarctic climate (Dfc). Winters are very severe by Scandinavian standards, but are somewhat moderated by marine air from the North Atlantic. As a result, certain cities on the North American Great Plains such as Winnipeg and Grand Forks, along with East Asian cities even further south, have colder January averages than Gällivare. The winter temperature varies greatly due to the city's location between the open ocean and a large, snow-covered land mass, and can be −30 °C (−22 °F) one day to 0 °C (32 °F) the next.

Gällivare experiences midnight sun for a significant period of summer, though sees some glimpses of daylight even during the winter solstice due to its notable distance from the Arctic Circle. As a result of prolonged warming from early morning by the midnight sun and Gällivare's inland position, temperatures can occasionally get hot in the summer. The all-time high stands at 34.5 °C (94.1 °F).

Climate data for Gällivare (averages 2002–2018; extremes since 1901)
Month	Jan	Feb	Mar	Apr	May	Jun	Jul	Aug	Sep	Oct	Nov	Dec	Year
Record high °C (°F)	7.6 (45.7)	7.5 (45.5)	12.5 (54.5)	19.0 (66.2)	28.2 (82.8)	30.6 (87.1)	34.5 (94.1)	31.4 (88.5)	24.1 (75.4)	16.7 (62.1)	10.7 (51.3)	8.0 (46.4)	34.5 (94.1)
Mean maximum °C (°F)	1.8 (35.2)	3.3 (37.9)	5.9 (42.6)	11.9 (53.4)	21.2 (70.2)	24.5 (76.1)	25.7 (78.3)	24.5 (76.1)	19.2 (66.6)	11.2 (52.2)	4.6 (40.3)	3.4 (38.1)	27.1 (80.8)
Mean daily maximum °C (°F)	−8.2 (17.2)	−6.6 (20.1)	−1.3 (29.7)	4.5 (40.1)	11.1 (52.0)	16.2 (61.2)	20.1 (68.2)	17.3 (63.1)	11.6 (52.9)	3.4 (38.1)	−2.7 (27.1)	−5.5 (22.1)	5.0 (41.0)
Daily mean °C (°F)	−13.1 (8.4)	−11.9 (10.6)	−6.9 (19.6)	−0.5 (31.1)	5.9 (42.6)	11.0 (51.8)	14.7 (58.5)	12.2 (54.0)	7.2 (45.0)	0.1 (32.2)	−6.9 (19.6)	−10.2 (13.6)	0.1 (32.3)
Mean daily minimum °C (°F)	−18.0 (−0.4)	−17.1 (1.2)	−12.5 (9.5)	−5.4 (22.3)	0.7 (33.3)	5.7 (42.3)	9.2 (48.6)	7.0 (44.6)	2.7 (36.9)	−3.3 (26.1)	−11.0 (12.2)	−14.9 (5.2)	−4.7 (23.5)
Mean minimum °C (°F)	−31.8 (−25.2)	−31.4 (−24.5)	−26.5 (−15.7)	−17.8 (0.0)	−6.5 (20.3)	−1.2 (29.8)	2.7 (36.9)	−0.3 (31.5)	−4.2 (24.4)	−14.6 (5.7)	−24.1 (−11.4)	−28.5 (−19.3)	−34.9 (−30.8)
Record low °C (°F)	−43.3 (−45.9)	−40.0 (−40.0)	−36.5 (−33.7)	−33.5 (−28.3)	−20.0 (−4.0)	−6.0 (21.2)	0.0 (32.0)	−4.0 (24.8)	−10.3 (13.5)	−24.0 (−11.2)	−33.5 (−28.3)	−39.1 (−38.4)	−43.3 (−45.9)
Average precipitation mm (inches)	40.8 (1.61)	32.6 (1.28)	21.9 (0.86)	26.9 (1.06)	50.3 (1.98)	65.7 (2.59)	97.8 (3.85)	76.0 (2.99)	69.2 (2.72)	42.8 (1.69)	49.9 (1.96)	48.4 (1.91)	622.3 (24.5)
Source 1: SMHI Open Data
Source 2: SMHI climate data 2002–2018

== High incidence of congenital insensitivity to pain ==
Some inhabitants near Gällivare, mainly in the village of Tjautjas (also Tjautjasjaure or Čavččas) 20 km outside Gällivare, have a remarkably high incidence of congenital insensitivity to pain, an extremely rare disease which inhibits the sensation of pain, heat and cold. There have been nearly 40 reported cases in the area.

== Sports ==
The following sports clubs are located in Gällivare:

- Gällivare Malmbergets FF
