= Latvia at the 1998 Winter Olympics =

- IOC code: LAT
- NOC: Latvian Olympic Committee
- Website: www.olimpiade.lv (in Latvian and English)

in Nagano
- Competitors: 29 (21 men, 8 women) in 6 sports
- Flag bearers: Sandis Prūsis, Bobsleigh
- Medals: Gold 0 Silver 0 Bronze 0 Total 0

Winter Olympics appearances (overview)
- 1924; 1928; 1932; 1936; 1948–1988; 1992; 1994; 1998; 2002; 2006; 2010; 2014; 2018; 2022; 2026; 2030

Other related appearances
- Soviet Union (1956–1988)

Latvia was represented at the 1998 Winter Olympics in Nagano, Japan by the Latvian Olympic Committee.

In total, 29 athletes including 21 men and eight women represented Latvia in six different sports including alpine skiing, biathlon, bobsleigh, cross-country skiing, luge and speed skating. No athletes won medals but three top-five finishes were achieved.

== Competitors ==
In total, 29 athletes represented Latvia at the 1998 Winter Olympics in Nagano, Japan across six different sports.

Sport	Men	Women	Total
Alpine skiing	1	1	2
Biathlon	4	1	5
Bobsleigh	6	–	6
Cross-country skiing	3	2	5
Luge	7	3	10
Speed skating	0	1	1
Total	21	8	29

== Alpine skiing ==
Two Latvian athletes participated in the alpine skiing events – Ilze Ābola and Ivars Ciaguns.

The men's giant slalom took place on 19 February 1998. Ciaguns completed his first run in one minute 28.52 seconds and his second run in one minute 25.07 seconds for a combined time of two minutes 53.59 seconds to finish 34th overall.

The women's giant slalom took place on 20 February 1998. Ābola completed her first run in one minute 30.66 seconds and her second run in one minute 43.84 seconds for a combined time of three minutes 14.5 seconds to finish 31st overall.

Men

Athlete	Event	Race 1	Race 2	Total	
Athlete	Event	Time	Time	Time	Rank
Ivars Ciaguns	Giant Slalom	1:28.52	1:25.07	2:53.59	34

Women

Athlete	Event	Race 1	Race 2	Total	
Athlete	Event	Time	Time	Time	Rank
Ilze Ābola	Giant Slalom	1:30.66	1:43.84	3:14.50	31

== Biathlon ==
Five Latvian athlete participated in the biathlon events – Ilmārs Bricis, Ieva Cederštrēma-Volfa, Oļegs Maļuhins, Jēkabs Nākums and Gundars Upenieks.

The women's individual took place on 9 February 1998. Cederštrēma-Volfa completed the course in 57 minutes 54.4 seconds but with one shooting miss for an adjusted time of 58 minutes 54.4 seconds to finish 25th overall.

The men's individual took place on 11 February 1998. Bricis completed the course in 55 minutes 15.1 seconds but with three shooting misses for an adjusted time of 58 minutes 15.1 seconds to finish fifth overall. Nākums completed the course in 56 minutes 40.1 seconds but with five shooting misses for an adjusted time of one hour one minute 40.1 seconds to finish 37th overall. Upenieks completed the course in 58 minutes 42.6 seconds but with eight shooting misses for an adjusted time of one hour six minute 42.6 seconds to finish 66th overall.

The women's sprint took place on 15 February 1998. Cederštrēma-Volfa completed the course in 25 minutes 12.7 seconds with two shooting misses to finish 34th overall.

The men's sprint took place on 18 February 1998. Bricis completed the course in 30 minutes 1.7 seconds with four shooting misses to finish 32nd overall. Maļuhins completed the course in 28 minutes 37.4 seconds with one shooting miss to finish sixth overall. Nākums completed the course in 28 minutes 36.9 seconds with one shooting miss to finish fifth overall.

The men's relay took place on 21 February 1998. Latvia started strongly and Maļuhins, the lead-off, completed the course in 20 minutes 18.2 seconds with no shooting misses but two extra shots to put Latvia in second place. On the second leg, Bricis completed what would be the fastest leg of the competition 19 minutes 46.7 seconds with no shooting misses but one extra shot as Latvia were in the lead at the halfway stage. On the third leg, Upenieks completed the course in 22 minutes 48.1 seconds but with one shooting miss and six extra shots. On the anchor leg, Nākums completed the course in 21 minutes 31.4 seconds with one shooting miss but three extra shots. The team took a combined time of one hour 24 minutes 24.4 seconds to finish sixth overall.

Men

Event	Athlete	Misses ^{1}	Time	Rank
10 km Sprint	Ilmārs Bricis	4	30:01.7	32
10 km Sprint	Oļegs Maļuhins	1	28:37.4	6
10 km Sprint	Jēkabs Nākums	1	28:36.9	5

Event	Athlete	Time	Misses	Adjusted time ^{2}	Rank
20 km	Gundars Upenieks	58:42.6	8	1'06:42.6	66
20 km	Jēkabs Nākums	56:40.1	5	1'01:40.1	37
20 km	Ilmārs Bricis	55:15.1	3	58:15.1	5

Men's 4 × 7.5 km relay

Athletes	Race		
Athletes	Misses ^{1}	Time	Rank
Oļegs Maļuhins; Ilmārs Bricis; Gundars Upenieks; Jēkabs Nākums	2	1'24:24.4	6

Women

Event	Athlete	Misses ^{1}	Time	Rank
7.5 km Sprint	Ieva Cederštrēma-Volfa	2	25:12.7	34

Event	Athlete	Time	Misses	Adjusted time ^{2}	Rank
15 km	Ieva Cederštrēma-Volfa	57:54.4	1	58:54.4	25

^{1} A penalty loop of 150 metres had to be skied per missed target.
^{2} One minute added per missed target.

== Bobsleigh ==
Six Latvian athlete participated in the bobsleigh events – Egils Bojārs, Jānis Elsiņš, Rodžers Lodziņš, Jānis Ozols, Sandis Prūsis and Māris Rozentāls.

The two-man bobsleigh took place on 14 and 15 February 1998. The first two runs took place on 14 February and the last two runs on 15 February. Prūsis and Elsiņš were in sled LAT-1 and Lodziņš and Rozentāls were in sled LAT-2. In the first runs, LAT-1 completed the course in 54.91 seconds and LAT-2 completed the course in 55.34 seconds. In the second runs, LAT-1 brought themselves into medal contention as they completed the course in 54.52 seconds. LAT-2 completed the course in 55.25 seconds. In the third runs, LAT-1 completed the course in 54.29 seconds – their fastest run of the competition. LAT-2 completed the course in 55.06 seconds. In the final runs, LAT-1 completed the course in 54.52 seconds and LAT-2 completed the course in 55.1 seconds. LAT-1's combined time of three minutes 38.24 seconds saw them finish in fifth place overall just one second behind the gold medal winners. LAT-2's combined time of three minutes 40.75 seconds saw them finish in 18th place overall

The four-man bobsleigh took place on 20 and 21 February 1998. The first two runs took place on 20 February and the last two runs on 21 February. In their first run, Prūsis, Bojārs, Ozols and Elsiņš completed the course in 52.98 seconds. The second runs were cancelled due to bad weather. They completed run three in 53.5 seconds and their final run in 53.78 seconds. Their total time of two minutes 40.26 seconds saw them finish in sixth place overall just 0.2 seconds outside the medal places.

Sled	Athletes	Event	Run 1		Run 2		Run 3		Run 4		Total	
Sled	Athletes	Event	Time	Rank	Time	Rank	Time	Rank	Time	Rank	Time	Rank
LAT-1	Sandis Prūsis; Jānis Elsiņš	Two-man	54.91	10	54.52	3	54.29	4	54.52	6	3:38.24	5
LAT-2	Rodžers Lodziņš; Māris Rozentāls	Two-man	55.34	18	55.25	21	55.06	17	55.10	20	3:40.75	18

Sled	Athletes	Event	Run 1		Run 2		Run 3		Total	
Sled	Athletes	Event	Time	Rank	Time	Rank	Time	Rank	Time	Rank
LAT-1	Sandis Prūsis; Egils Bojārs; Jānis Ozols; Jānis Elsiņš	Four-man	52.98	5	53.50	7	53.78	6	2:40.26	6

== Cross-country skiing ==
Five Latvian athletes participated in the cross-country skiing events – Andžela Brice, Juris Ģērmanis, Jānis Hermanis, Roberts Raimo and Ināra Rudko.

The women's 15 km classical took place on 8 February 1998. Rudko completed the course in 56 minutes 7.8 seconds to finish 61st overall.

The men's 30 km classical took place on 9 February 1998. Hermanis did not finish the race.

The women's 5 km classical also took place on 9 February 1998. Brice completed the course in 21 minutes 39.2 seconds to finish 78th overall. Rudko completed the course in 20 minutes 56.1 seconds to finish 71st overall.

The women's 10 km freestyle pursuit took place on 10 February 1998. Brice completed the combined courses in 37 minutes 7.5 seconds to finish 66th overall. Rudko completed the combined courses in 37 minutes 20.3 seconds to finish 67th overall.

The men's 10 km classical took place on 12 February 1998. Ģērmanis completed the course in 32 minutes 5.8 seconds to finish 77th overall. Hermanis completed the course in 31 minutes 12.1 seconds to finish 65th overall. Raimo completed the course in 33 minutes 9.9 seconds to finish 83rd overall.

The men's 15 km freestyle pursuit took place on 14 February 1998. Hermanis completed the combined courses in 49 minutes 55.1 seconds to finish 63rd overall. Ģērmanis did not finish the race and Raimo did not start.

The women's 30 km freestyle took place on 20 February 1998. Brice completed the course in one hour 37 minutes 8.4 seconds to finish 53rd overall. Rudko completed the course in one hour 43 minutes 22.8 seconds to finish 57th overall.

The men's 50 km freestyle took place on 22 February 1998. Raimo completed the course in two hours 30 minutes 49.9 seconds to finish 60th overall.

Men

Event	Athlete	Race	
Event	Athlete	Time	Rank
10 km C	Roberts Raimo	33:09.9	83
10 km C	Juris Ģērmanis	32:05.8	77
10 km C	Jānis Hermanis	31:12.1	65
15 km pursuit^{1} F	Juris Ģērmanis	DNF	–
15 km pursuit^{1} F	Jānis Hermanis	49:55.1	63
30 km C	Jānis Hermanis	DNF	–
50 km F	Roberts Raimo	2'30:49.9	60

^{1} Starting delay based on 10 km results.
C = Classical style, F = Freestyle

Women

Event	Athlete	Race	
Event	Athlete	Time	Rank
5 km C	Andžela Brice	21:39.2	78
5 km C	Ināra Rudko	20:56.1	71
10 km pursuit^{2} F	Ināra Rudko	37:20.3	67
10 km pursuit^{2} F	Andžela Brice	37:07.5	66
15 km C	Ināra Rudko	56:07.8	61
30 km F	Ināra Rudko	1'43:22.8	57
30 km F	Andžela Brice	1'37:08.4	53

^{2} Starting delay based on 5 km results.
C = Classical style, F = Freestyle

== Luge ==
Ten Latvian athletes participated in the luge events – Sandris Bērzinš, Iluta Gaile, Māris Lēģeris, Dairis Leksis, Anna Orlova, Guntis Rēķis, Mārtiņš Rubenis, Jurita Šnitko, Roberts Suharevs and Juris Vovčoks.

The men's singles took place on 8 and 9 February 1998. The first two runs took place on 8 February and the last two runs on 9 February. In the first runs, Bērzinš completed the course in 51.22 seconds, Rēķis in 50.676 seconds and Rubenis in 50.758 seconds. Bērzinš completed his second run in 51.37 seconds, Rēķis in 50.296 seconds and Rubenis in 50.491 seconds. Bērzinš completed run three in 51.341 seconds, Rēķis in 50.545 seconds and Rubenis in 50.603 seconds. Bērzinš' final run was 51.46 seconds, Rēķis' was 50.798 seconds and Rubenis' was 50.3 seconds. Bērzinš' total time of three minutes 25.391 seconds saw him finish in 25th place overall. Rēķis' total time of three minutes 22.315 seconds saw him finish in 17th place overall. Rubenis' total time of three minutes 22.152 seconds saw him finish in 14th place overall.

The women's singles took place on 10 and 11 February 1998. The first two runs took place on 10 February and the last two runs on 11 February. In the first runs, Gaile completed the course in 52.157 seconds, Orlova in 52.199 seconds and Šnitko in 52.921 seconds. Gaile completed her second run in 52.016 seconds, Orlova in 51.772 seconds and Šnitko in 52.638 seconds. Gaile completed run three in 51.516 seconds, Orlova in 51.642 seconds and Šnitko in 52.347 seconds. Gaile's final run was 51.292 seconds, Orlova's was 51.35 seconds and Šnitko's was 51.801 seconds. Gaile's total time of three minutes 26.981 seconds saw her finish in 14th place overall. Orlova's total time of three minutes 26.963 seconds saw her finish in 13th place overall. Šnitko's total time of three minutes 29.707 seconds saw him finish in 22nd place overall.

The doubles took place on 13 February 1998. Suharevs and Leksis completed their first run in 51.281 seconds and their second run in 51.97 seconds for a combined time of one minute 43.251 seconds to finish 13th overall. Vovčoks and Lēģeris completed their first run in 53.969 seconds and their second run in 52.586 seconds for a combined time of one minute 46.555 seconds to finish 17th overall.

Men

Athlete	Run 1		Run 2		Run 3		Run 4		Total	
Athlete	Time	Rank	Time	Rank	Time	Rank	Time	Rank	Time	Rank
Sandris Bērzinš	51.220	24	51.370	26	51.341	23	51.460	25	3:25.391	25
Mārtiņš Rubenis	50.758	22	50.491	19	50.603	16	50.300	13	3:22.152	14
Guntis Rēķis	50.676	18	50.296	15	50.545	15	50.798	22	3:22.315	17

Doubles

Athletes	Run 1		Run 2		Total	
Athletes	Time	Rank	Time	Rank	Time	Rank
Roberts Suharevs; Dairis Leksis	51.281	8	51.970	15	1:43.251	13
Juris Vovčoks; Māris Lēģeris	53.969	17	52.586	16	1:46.555	17

Women

Athlete	Run 1		Run 2		Run 3		Run 4		Total	
Athlete	Time	Rank	Time	Rank	Time	Rank	Time	Rank	Time	Rank
Jurita Šnitko	52.921	24	52.638	22	52.347	25	51.801	21	3:29.707	22
Anna Orlova	52.199	16	51.772	10	51.642	16	51.350	16	3:26.963	13
Iluta Gaile	52.157	14	52.016	14	51.516	12	51.292	13	3:26.981	14

== Speed skating ==
One Latvian athletes participated in the speed skating events – Ilonda Lūse.

The women's 3000 m took place on 11 February 1998. Lūse completed the course in four minutes 33.77 seconds to finish 28th overall.

The women's 1500 m took place on 16 February 1998. Lūse completed the course in two minutes 8.71 seconds to finish 32nd overall.

The women's 1000 m took place on 19 February 1998. Lūse completed the course in one minute 24.32 seconds to finish 39th overall.

Women

Event	Athlete	Race	
Event	Athlete	Time	Rank
1000 m	Ilonda Lūse	1:24.32	39
1500 m	Ilonda Lūse	2:08.71	32
3000 m	Ilonda Lūse	4:33.77	28
