= Latvia at the 1994 Winter Olympics =

- IOC code: LAT
- NOC: Latvian Olympic Committee
- Website: www.olimpiade.lv (in Latvian and English)

in Lillehammer
- Competitors: 27 (20 men, 7 women) in 6 sports
- Flag bearer: Zintis Ekmanis (bobsleigh)
- Medals: Gold 0 Silver 0 Bronze 0 Total 0

Winter Olympics appearances (overview)
- 1924; 1928; 1932; 1936; 1948–1988; 1992; 1994; 1998; 2002; 2006; 2010; 2014; 2018; 2022; 2026

Other related appearances
- Soviet Union (1956–1988)

Latvia was represented at the 1994 Winter Olympics in Lillehammer, Norway by the Latvian Olympic Committee.

In total, 27 athletes including 20 men and seven women represented Latvia in six different sports including biathlon, bobsleigh, cross-country skiing, figure skating, luge and speed skating. No athletes won medals but three top-10 finishes were achieved.

== Competitors ==
In total, 27 athletes represented Latvia at the 1998 Winter Olympics in Lillehammer, Norway across six different sports.

Sport	Men	Women	Total
Biathlon	4	1	5
Bobsleigh	8	–	8
Cross-country skiing	1	1	2
Figure skating	2	1	3
Luge	5	3	8
Speed skating	0	1	1
Total	20	7	27

== Biathlon ==
Five Latvian athletes participated in the biathlon events – Aivars Bogdanovs, Ilmārs Bricis, Ieva Cederštrēma-Volfa, Oļegs Maļuhins and Gundars Upenieks.

The biathlon events took place at the Birkebeineren Ski Stadium in Lillehammer from 18 to 26 February 1994.

Men

Event	Athlete	Misses ^{1}	Time	Rank
10 km Sprint	Aivars Bogdanovs	6	33:52.0	66
10 km Sprint	Ilmārs Bricis	4	31:36.9	41

Event	Athlete	Time	Misses	Adjusted time ^{2}	Rank
20 km	Oļegs Maļuhins	58:02.1	4	1'02:02.1	40
20 km	Gundars Upenieks	58:26.5	2	1'00:26.5	19

Men's 4 × 7.5 km relay

Athletes	Race		
Athletes	Misses ^{1}	Time	Rank
Oļegs Maļuhins; Ilmārs Bricis; Aivars Bogdanovs; Gundars Upenieks	4	1'37:40.5	16

Women

Event	Athlete	Misses ^{1}	Time	Rank
7.5 km Sprint	Ieva Cederštrēma-Volfa	3	27:52.6	28

Event	Athlete	Time	Misses	Adjusted time ^{2}	Rank
15 km	Ieva Cederštrēma-Volfa	52:03.8	5	57:03.8	30

^{1} A penalty loop of 150 metres had to be skied per missed target.
^{2} One minute added per missed target.

== Bobsleigh ==
Eight Latvian athletes participated in the bobsleigh events – Boriss Artemjevs, Zintis Ekmanis, Aldis Intlers, Adris Plūksna, Sandis Prūsis, Otomārs Rihters, Didzis Skuška and Juris Tone.

The bobsleigh events took place at the Lillehammer Olympic Bobsleigh and Luge Track in Hunderfossen from 19 to 27 February 1994.

Athlete	Event	Final					
Athlete	Event	Run 1	Run 2	Run 3	Run 4	Total	Rank
Zintis Ekmanis; Aldis Intlers	Two-man	52.75	53.42	53.20	53.46	3:32.83	10
Sandis Prūsis; Adris Plūksna	Two-man	53.31	53.40	53.35	53.52	3:33.58	16
Zintis Ekmanis; Boriss Artemjevs; Aldis Intlers; Didzis Skuška	Four-man	52.49	52.27	52.55	52.50	3:29.81	13
Sandis Prūsis; Juris Tone; Otomārs Rihters; Adris Plūksna	Four-man	52.67	52.66	52.69	52.79	3:30.81	19

== Cross-country skiing ==
Two Latvian athletes participated in the cross-country skiing events – Jānis Hermanis and Ineta Kravale.

The cross-country skiing events also took place at the Birkebeineren Ski Stadium in Lillehammer from 13 to 27 February 1994.

Men

Event	Athlete	Race	
Event	Athlete	Time	Rank
10 km C	Jānis Hermanis	30:57.3	85
15 km pursuit^{1} F	Jānis Hermanis	50:57.5	72
30 km F	Jānis Hermanis	1'34:10.5	69
50 km C	Jānis Hermanis	2'36:11.1	61

^{1} Starting delay based on 10 km results.
C = Classical style, F = Freestyle

Women

Event	Athlete	Race	
Event	Athlete	Time	Rank
5 km C	Ineta Kravale	17:21.5	61
15 km F	Ineta Kravale	49:37.7	52
30 km C	Ineta Kravale	1'38:41.8	48

^{2} Starting delay based on 5 km results.
C = Classical style, F = Freestyle

== Figure skating ==
Three Latvian athletes participated in the figure skating events – Elena Berezhnaya, Oļegs Šļahovs and Andrejs Vlaščenko.

The figure skating events took place at the Hamar Olympic Amphitheatre in Hamar from 13 to 25 February 1994.

Men

Athlete	SP	FS	TFP	Rank
Andrejs Vlaščenko	21	20	30.5	21

Pairs

Athletes	SP	FS	TFP	Rank
Elena Berezhnaya; Oļegs Šļahovs	9	9	13.5	8

== Luge ==
Eight Latvian athletes participated in the luge events – Agris Elerts, Iluta Gaile, Dairis Leksis, Anna Orlova, Roberts Suharevs, Evija Šulce, Aivis Švāns and Juris Vovčoks.

The luge events also took place at the Lillehammer Olympic Bobsleigh and Luge Track in Hunderfossen from 13 to 18 February 1994.

Athlete	Event	Final					
Athlete	Event	Run 1	Run 2	Run 3	Run 4	Total	Rank
Agris Elerts	Men's singles	51.395	51.777	51.237	51.584	3:25.993	18
Juris Vovčoks	Men's singles	51.647	51.794	51.769	51.738	3:26.948	21
Iluta Gaile	Women's singles	49.973	49.736	49.636	49.704	3:19.049	17
Anna Orlova	Women's singles	49.301	49.526	49.297	49.363	3:17.487	9
Evija Šulce	Women's singles	49.795	49.819	49.625	49.718	3:18.957	16
Aivis Švāns; Roberts Suharevs	Doubles	48.949	48.918			1:37.867	11
Juris Vovčoks; Dairis Leksis	Doubles	49.014	49.201			1:38.215	12

== Speed skating ==
One Latvian athletes participated in the speed skating events – Ilonda Lūse.

The speed skating events took place at the Hamar Olympic Hall in Hamar from 13 to 25 February.

Women

Event	Athlete	Race	
Event	Athlete	Time	Rank
3000 m	Ilonda Lūse	4:47.75	25
