= Latvia at the 1992 Winter Olympics =

- IOC code: LAT
- NOC: Latvian Olympic Committee
- Website: www.olimpiade.lv (in Latvian and English)

in Albertville
- Competitors: 23 (19 men, 4 women) in 6 sports
- Flag bearer: Jānis Ķipurs
- Medals: Gold 0 Silver 0 Bronze 0 Total 0

Winter Olympics appearances (overview)
- 1924; 1928; 1932; 1936; 1948–1988; 1992; 1994; 1998; 2002; 2006; 2010; 2014; 2018; 2022; 2026

Other related appearances
- Soviet Union (1956–1988)

Latvia was represented at the 1992 Winter Olympics in Albertville, France by the Latvian Olympic Committee.

In total, 23 athletes including 19 men and four women represented Latvia in six different sports including biathlon, bobsleigh, cross-country skiing, figure skating, freestyle skiing and luge.

The games marked the first time since 1936 that Latvia had competed as an independent nation at the Winter Olympics. Latvian athletes had competed for the Soviet Union from 1956 to 1988.

== Competitors ==
In total, 23 athletes represented Latvia at the 1992 Winter Olympics in Albertville, France across six different sports.

| Sport | Men | Women | Total |
|---|---|---|---|
| Biathlon | 4 | 0 | 4 |
| Bobsleigh | 8 | – | 8 |
| Cross-country skiing | 1 | 0 | 1 |
| Figure skating | 1 | 1 | 2 |
| Freestyle skiing | 2 | 0 | 2 |
| Luge | 3 | 3 | 6 |
| Total | 19 | 4 | 23 |

== Biathlon ==
Four Latvian athletes participated in the biathlon events – Aivars Bogdanovs, Ilmārs Bricis, Oļegs Maļuhins and Gundars Upenieks.

The biathlon events took place at Les Saisies from 11 to 20 February 1992.

Men

| Event | Athlete | Misses ^{1} | Time | Rank |
|---|---|---|---|---|
| 10 km Sprint | Gundars Upenieks | 1 | 28:32.7 | 44 |
| 10 km Sprint | Aivars Bogdanovs | 1 | 28:24.2 | 40 |
| 10 km Sprint | Ilmārs Bricis | 1 | 28:23.3 | 39 |
| 10 km Sprint | Oļegs Maļuhins | 0 | 27:17.7 | 13 |

| Event | Athlete | Time | Misses | Adjusted time ^{2} | Rank |
|---|---|---|---|---|---|
| 20 km | Oļegs Maļuhins | 1'00:10.1 | 6 | 1'06:10.1 | 69 |
| 20 km | Aivars Bogdanovs | 1'00:28.5 | 4 | 1'04:28.5 | 62 |
| 20 km | Ilmārs Bricis | 59:27.3 | 5 | 1'04:27.3 | 61 |
| 20 km | Gundars Upenieks | 1'01:01.6 | 1 | 1'02:01.6 | 35 |

Men's 4 × 7.5 km relay

| Athletes | Race | | |
| Athletes | Misses ^{1} | Time | Rank |
|---|---|---|---|
| Oļegs Maļuhins; Aivars Bogdanovs; Ilmārs Bricis; Gundars Upenieks | 3 | 1'33:31.1 | 16 |

^{1} A penalty loop of 150 metres had to be skied per missed target.
^{2} One minute added per missed target.

== Bobsleigh ==
Eight Latvian athletes participated in the bobsleigh events – Boriss Artemjevs, Ivars Bērzups, Zintis Ekmanis, Aldis Intlers, Adris Plūksna, Sandis Prūsis, Otomārs Rihters and Juris Tone.

The bobsleigh events took place at La Plagne bobsleigh, luge, and skeleton track in La Plagne from 15 to 22 February 1992.

| Sled | Athletes | Event | Run 1 | | Run 2 | | Run 3 | | Run 4 | | Total | |
| Sled | Athletes | Event | Time | Rank | Time | Rank | Time | Rank | Time | Rank | Time | Rank |
|---|---|---|---|---|---|---|---|---|---|---|---|---|
| LAT-1 | Zintis Ekmanis; Aldis Intlers | Two-man | 1:00.94 | 14 | 1:01.57 | 16 | 1:01.88 | 18 | 1:01.94 | 18 | 4:06.33 | 16 |
| LAT-2 | Sandis Prūsis; Adris Plūksna | Two-man | 1:00.92 | 13 | 1:01.40 | 13 | 1:01.56 | 13 | 1:01.74 | 16 | 4:05.62 | 15 |

| Sled | Athletes | Event | Run 1 | | Run 2 | | Run 3 | | Run 4 | | Total | |
| Sled | Athletes | Event | Time | Rank | Time | Rank | Time | Rank | Time | Rank | Time | Rank |
|---|---|---|---|---|---|---|---|---|---|---|---|---|
| LAT-1 | Sandis Prūsis; Juris Tone; Ivars Bērzups; Adris Plūksna | Four-man | 59.05 | 19 | 59.07 | 16 | 58.72 | 8 | 59.08 | 13 | 3:55.92 | 14 |
| LAT-2 | Zintis Ekmanis; Aldis Intlers; Boriss Artemjevs; Otomārs Rihters | Four-man | 59.02 | 16 | 58.99 | 13 | 59.35 | 18 | 59.36 | 16 | 3:56.72 | 16 |

== Cross-country skiing ==
One Latvian athlete participated in the cross-country skiing events – Jānis Hermanis.

The cross-country skiing events also took place at Les Saisies from 9 to 22 February 1992.

Men

| Event | Athlete | Race | |
| Event | Athlete | Time | Rank |
|---|---|---|---|
| 10 km C | Jānis Hermanis | 35:49.8 | 88 |
| 15 km pursuit^{1} F | Jānis Hermanis | 53:12.9 | 78 |
| 30 km C | Jānis Hermanis | 1'44:43.2 | 77 |
| 50 km F | Jānis Hermanis | 2'37:24.3 | 66 |

^{1} Starting delay based on 10 km results.
C = Classical style, F = Freestyle

== Figure skating ==
Two Latvian athletes participated in the figure skating events – Konstantin Kostin and Alma Lepina.

The figure skating events took place at La halle de glace Olympique in Albertville from 9 to 21 February 1992.

Men

| Athlete | SP | FS | TFP | Rank |
|---|---|---|---|---|
| Konstantin Kostin | 18 | 22 | 31.0 | 20 |

Women

| Athlete | SP | FS | TFP | Rank |
|---|---|---|---|---|
| Alma Lepina | 22 | 20 | 31.5 | 20 |

== Freestyle skiing ==
Two Latvian athletes participated in the freestyle skiing events – Normunds Aplociņš and Dans Jansons.

The freestyle skiing events took place at Tignes from 12 to 13 February 1992.

Men

| Athlete | Event | Qualification | | | Final | | |
| Athlete | Event | Time | Points | Rank | Time | Points | Rank |
|---|---|---|---|---|---|---|---|
| Dans Jansons | Moguls | 34.98 | 12.93 | 42 | did not advance | | |
| Normunds Aplociņš | Moguls | 34.76 | 17.03 | 34 | did not advance | | |

== Luge ==
Six Latvian athletes participated in the luge events – Agris Elerts, Iluta Gaile, Anna Orlova, Aivars Polis, Roberts Suharevs and Evija Šulce.

The luge events also took place at La Plagne bobsleigh, luge, and skeleton track in La Plagne from 9 to 14 February 1992.

Men

| Athlete | Run 1 | | Run 2 | | Run 3 | | Run 4 | | Total | |
| Athlete | Time | Rank | Time | Rank | Time | Rank | Time | Rank | Time | Rank |
|---|---|---|---|---|---|---|---|---|---|---|
| Agris Elerts | 45.785 | 12 | 45.906 | 15 | 46.456 | 13 | 46.527 | 16 | 3:04.674 | 13 |

(Men's) Doubles

| Athletes | Run 1 | | Run 2 | | Total | |
| Athletes | Time | Rank | Time | Rank | Time | Rank |
|---|---|---|---|---|---|---|
| Aivars Polis; Roberts Suharevs | 46.988 | 13 | 46.961 | 11 | 1:33.949 | 11 |

Women

| Athlete | Run 1 | | Run 2 | | Run 3 | | Run 4 | | Total | |
| Athlete | Time | Rank | Time | Rank | Time | Rank | Time | Rank | Time | Rank |
|---|---|---|---|---|---|---|---|---|---|---|
| Iluta Gaile | 47.412 | 16 | 47.192 | 9 | 47.377 | 14 | 47.314 | 17 | 3:09.295 | 15 |
| Evija Šulce | 47.386 | 15 | 47.326 | 15 | 47.388 | 15 | 47.107 | 13 | 3:09.207 | 14 |
| Anna Orlova | 47.263 | 12 | 47.293 | 13 | 47.161 | 7 | 47.081 | 12 | 3:08.798 | 11 |
