= Latvia at the 2002 Winter Olympics =

- IOC code: LAT
- NOC: Latvian Olympic Committee
- Website: www.olimpiade.lv (in Latvian and English)

in Salt Lake City
- Competitors: 47 (42 men, 5 women) in 8 sports
- Flag bearers: Harijs Vītoliņš, ice hockey
- Medals: Gold 0 Silver 0 Bronze 0 Total 0

Winter Olympics appearances (overview)
- 1924; 1928; 1932; 1936; 1948–1988; 1992; 1994; 1998; 2002; 2006; 2010; 2014; 2018; 2022; 2026; 2030

Other related appearances
- Soviet Union (1956–1988)

Latvia competed at the 2002 Winter Olympics in Salt Lake City, United States.

== Alpine skiing ==
Men

Athlete	Event	Race 1	Race 2	Total	
Athlete	Event	Time	Time	Time	Rank
Ivars Ciaguns	Giant Slalom	DNF	–	DNF	–
Ivars Ciaguns	Slalom	56.31	58.42	1:54.73	25

== Biathlon ==
Men

Event	Athlete	Misses ^{1}	Time	Rank
10 km sprint	Gundars Upenieks	3	28:11.9	65
10 km sprint	Jēkabs Nākums	1	27:40.9	52
10 km sprint	Oļegs Maļuhins	3	27:30.7	46
10 km sprint	Ilmārs Bricis	2	27:17.3	40
12.5 km pursuit ^{2}	Jēkabs Nākums	5	39:19.3	54
12.5 km pursuit ^{2}	Ilmārs Bricis	7	38:49.9	51
12.5 km pursuit ^{2}	Oļegs Maļuhins	3	36:10.5	30

Event	Athlete	Time	Misses	Adjusted time ^{3}	Rank
20 km	Oļegs Maļuhins	DNF	–	DNF	–
20 km	Gundars Upenieks	54:56.0	5	59:56.0	71
20 km	Ilmārs Bricis	53:24.4	3	56:24.4	39
20 km	Jēkabs Nākums	55:19.6	1	56:19.6	35

Men's 4 × 7.5 km relay

Athletes	Race		
Athletes	Misses ^{1}	Time	Rank
Oļegs Maļuhins; Jēkabs Nākums; Gundars Upenieks; Ilmārs Bricis	3	1'32:00.8	17

Women

Event	Athlete	Misses ^{1}	Time	Rank
7.5 km sprint	Andžela Brice	1	24:32.5	58
10 km pursuit ^{4}	Andžela Brice	DNF	DNF	–

Event	Athlete	Time	Misses	Adjusted time ^{3}	Rank
15 km	Andžela Brice	53:20.9	6	59:20.9	63

^{1} A penalty loop of 150 metres had to be skied per missed target.
^{2} Starting delay based on 10 km sprint results.
^{3} One minute added per missed target.

== Bobsleigh ==
Men

Sled	Athletes	Event	Run 1		Run 2		Run 3		Run 4		Total	
Sled	Athletes	Event	Time	Rank	Time	Rank	Time	Rank	Time	Rank	Time	Rank
LAT-1	Sandis Prūsis; Mārcis Rullis	Two-man	48.10	13	48.06	12	47.92	8	48.36	18	3:12.60	11
LAT-2	Intars Dīcmanis; Gatis Gūts	Two-man	48.07	12	48.22	18	48.14	13	48.25	15	3:12.68	13

Sled	Athletes	Event	Run 1		Run 2		Run 3		Run 4		Total	
Sled	Athletes	Event	Time	Rank	Time	Rank	Time	Rank	Time	Rank	Time	Rank
LAT-1	Sandis Prūsis; Mārcis Rullis; Jānis Silarājs; Jānis Ozols	Four-man	46.99	9	46.82	5	47.60	14	47.65	9	3:09.06	7
LAT-2	Gatis Gūts; Intars Dīcmanis; Māris Rozentāls; Gunārs Bumbulis	Four-man	46.99	9	46.99	11	47.80	16	47.66	10	3:09.44	12

== Cross-country skiing ==
Men

Pursuit

Athlete	10 km C		10 km F pursuit^{1}	
Athlete	Time	Rank	Time	Final rank
Juris Ģērmanis	28:41.1	53 Q	27:32.8	51

Event	Athlete	Race	
Event	Athlete	Time	Rank
15 km C	Juris Ģērmanis	41:50.1	49
30 km F	Juris Ģērmanis	1'22:30.4	58

^{1} Starting delay based on 10 km C. results.
C = Classical style, F = Freestyle

== Ice hockey ==
=== Men's tournament ===
==== Preliminary round - group A ====
Top team (shaded) advanced to the first round.

Team	GP	W	L	T	GF	GA	GD	Pts
Germany	3	3	0	0	10	3	+7	6
Latvia	3	1	1	1	11	12	−1	3
Austria	3	1	2	0	7	9	−2	2
Slovakia	3	0	2	1	8	12	−4	1

All times are local (UTC-7).

9 February 2002; 19:00	Latvia	4 – 2 (1–2, 1–2, 0–0)	Austria	Peaks Ice Arena, Provo; Attendance: 6,159

10 February 2002; 19:00	Latvia	6 – 6 (2–2, 2–4, 2–0)	Slovakia	E Center, West Valley City; Attendance: 8,377

12 February 2002; 19:00	Germany	4 – 1 (2–1, 2–0, 0–0)	Latvia	Peaks Ice Arena, Provo; Attendance: 6,574

==== Consolation round ====
9th place match

14 February 2002; 20:00	Ukraine	2 – 9 (0–6, 2–3, 0–0)	Latvia 9th	E Center, West Valley City; Attendance: 8,449

Contestants; Kaspars Astašenko; Aleksandrs Beļavskis; Igors Bondarevs; Aigars Cipruss; Vjačeslavs Fanduļs; Viktors Ignatjevs; Artūrs Irbe; Aleksandrs Kerčs; Rodrigo Laviņš; Aleksandrs Macijevskis; Andrejs Maticins; Sergejs Naumovs; Aleksandrs Ņiživijs; Sandis Ozoliņš; Grigorijs Panteļejevs; Aleksandrs Semjonovs; Sergejs Seņins; Kārlis Skrastiņš; Oļegs Sorokins; Leonīds Tambijevs; Atvars Tribuncovs; Harijs Vītoliņš

== Luge ==
Men

Athlete	Run 1		Run 2		Run 3		Run 4		Total	
Athlete	Time	Rank	Time	Rank	Time	Rank	Time	Rank	Time	Rank
Guntis Rēķis	45.898	28	45.644	28	45.446	28	45.716	30	3:02.704	29
Nauris Skraustiņš	45.335	23	45.389	26	44.904	21	45.061	14	3:00.689	22
Mārtiņš Rubenis	45.022	14	49.671	47	DNF	–	–	–	DNF	–

(Men's) doubles

Athletes	Run 1		Run 2		Total	
Athletes	Time	Rank	Time	Rank	Time	Rank
Ivars Deinis; Sandris Bērzinš	43.413	10	43.493	11	1:26.906	10

Women

Athlete	Run 1		Run 2		Run 3		Run 4		Total	
Athlete	Time	Rank	Time	Rank	Time	Rank	Time	Rank	Time	Rank
Maija Tīruma	44.050	18	43.954	19	43.971	21	43.956	20	2:55.931	18
Anna Orlova	43.795	8	43.658	10	43.642	10	43.644	10	2:54.739	9
Iluta Gaile	43.779	7	43.791	14	43.656	11	43.847	18	2:55.073	10

== Skeleton ==
Men

Athlete	Run 1		Run 2		Total	
Athlete	Time	Rank	Time	Rank	Time	Rank
Tomass Dukurs	52.29	21	52.38	20	1:44.67	21

== Speed skating ==
Women

Event	Athlete	Race	
Event	Athlete	Time	Rank
1500 m	Ilonda Lūse	2:04.25	35
3000 m	Ilonda Lūse	4:23.13	30
