= Latvia at the 2006 Winter Olympics =

- IOC code: LAT
- NOC: Latvian Olympic Committee
- Website: www.olimpiade.lv (in Latvian and English)

in Turin
- Competitors: 57 (49 men, 8 women) in 8 sports
- Flag bearers: Artūrs Irbe (opening); Ilmārs Bricis (closing)
- Medals Ranked 26th: Gold 0 Silver 0 Bronze 1 Total 1

Winter Olympics appearances (overview)
- 1924; 1928; 1932; 1936; 1948–1988; 1992; 1994; 1998; 2002; 2006; 2010; 2014; 2018; 2022; 2026; 2030

Other related appearances
- Soviet Union (1956–1988)

Latvia competed at the 2006 Winter Olympics in Turin, Italy. Mārtiņš Rubenis won Latvia's first Winter Olympic medal.

== Medalists ==
Medal	Name	Sport	Event
Bronze	Mārtiņš Rubenis	Luge	Men's singles

== Alpine skiing ==
Athlete	Event	Final				
Athlete	Event	Run 1	Run 2	Run 3	Total	Rank
Ivars Ciaguns	Men's super-G	n/a			1:38.18	52
Renārs Doršs	Men's downhill	n/a			1:57.54	46
Renārs Doršs	Men's combined	1:44.54	52.55	did not finish		

Note: In the men's combined, run 1 is the downhill, and runs 2 and 3 are the slalom. In the women's combined, run 1 and 2 are the slalom, and run 3 the downhill.

== Biathlon ==
Men

Athlete	Event	Final		
Athlete	Event	Time	Misses	Rank
Jānis Bērziņš	Sprint	29:09.9	1	48
Jānis Bērziņš	Pursuit	40:22.83	2	42
Jānis Bērziņš	Individual	59:24.3	2	37
Ilmārs Bricis	Sprint	27:26.9	1	12
Ilmārs Bricis	Pursuit	35:46.94	2	4
Ilmārs Bricis	Mass start	50:27.6	3	28
Ilmārs Bricis	Individual	57:19.2	4	19
Kristaps Lībietis	Sprint	29:21.9	0	54
Kristaps Lībietis	Pursuit	43:51.23	6	54
Kristaps Lībietis	Individual	1:03:13.4	4	68
Edgars Piksons	Individual	1:06:12.5	7	79
Raivis Zīmelis	Sprint	29:11.4	2	49
Raivis Zīmelis	Pursuit	40:58.04	7	46
Jānis Bērziņš; Edgars Piksons; Raivis Zīmelis; Ilmārs Bricis	Relay	1:28:10.6	5+12	16

Women

Athlete	Event	Final		
Athlete	Event	Time	Misses	Rank
Anžela Brice	Sprint	26:03.1	3	60
Anžela Brice	Pursuit	Lapped		
Anžela Brice	Individual	56:30.5	2	48
Gerda Krūmiņa	Sprint	27:30.5	3	74
Gerda Krūmiņa	Individual	1:00:26.1	4	70
Madara Līduma	Sprint	24:11.02	2	28
Madara Līduma	Pursuit	40:50.80	8	20
Madara Līduma	Mass start	43:52.7	5	20
Madara Līduma	Individual	52:27.2	4	10
Linda Savļaka	Sprint	26:54.6	1	72
Linda Savļaka	Individual	59:44.3	3	63
Madara Līduma; Anžela Brice; Linda Savļaka; Gerda Krūmiņa	Relay	1:26:21.3	2+11	18

== Bobsleigh ==
Athlete	Event	Final					
Athlete	Event	Run 1	Run 2	Run 3	Run 4	Total	Rank
Jānis Miņins; Daumants Dreiškens	Two-man	55.94	55.84	56.16	56.69	3:44.63	6
Gatis Gūts; Intars Dīcmanis	Two-man	56.37	56.36	57.05	57.73	3:47.51	20
Jānis Miņins; Daumants Dreiškens; Mārcis Rullis; Jānis Ozols	Four-man	55.88	55.69	55.51	55.51	3:42.59	10
Mihails Arhipovs; Intars Dīcmanis; Māris Bogdanovs; Reinis Rozītis	Four-man	56.34	56.54	56.13	did not advance		21

== Cross-country skiing ==
Distance

Athlete	Event	Final	
Athlete	Event	Total	Rank
Oļegs Andrejevs	Men's 15 km classical	45:44.2	77
Oļegs Andrejevs	Men's 50 km freestyle	Did not finish	
Valts Eiduks	Men's 15 km classical	44:12.0	69
Valts Eiduks	Men's 50 km freestyle	Did not finish	
Oļegs Maļuhins	Men's 50 km freestyle	2:15:10.6	60
Intars Spalviņš	Men's 15 km classical	45:13.4	75
Intars Spalviņš	Men's 50 km freestyle	Did not finish	

Sprint

Athlete	Event	Qualifying		Quarterfinal		Semifinal		Final	
Athlete	Event	Total	Rank	Total	Rank	Total	Rank	Total	Rank
Oļegs Andrejevs	Men's sprint	2:33.23	74	Did not advance					74
Valts Eiduks	Men's sprint	2:31.25	68	Did not advance					68
Oļegs Maļuhins	Men's sprint	2:24.88	50	Did not advance					50
Intars Spalviņš	Men's sprint	2:32.26	72	Did not advance					72

== Ice hockey ==
=== Men's tournament ===
Players

The following is the Latvian roster for the men's ice hockey tournament at the 2006 Winter Olympics.

Head coach: Leonīds Beresņevs

Assistant coach: Harijs Vītoliņš, Oļegs Znaroks

No.	Pos.	Name	Height	Weight	Birthdate	Team
1	G	Artūrs Irbe	5 ft 9 in (175 cm)	190 lb (86 kg)	February 2, 1967 (aged 39)	(Austria) EC Salzburg
2	D	Rodrigo Laviņš	5 ft 11 in (180 cm)	185 lb (84 kg)	August 3, 1974 (aged 31)	(Sweden) Brynäs IF
3	D	Arvīds Reķis	6 ft 0 in (183 cm)	216 lb (98 kg)	January 1, 1979 (aged 27)	(Germany) Augsburger Panther
4	D	Agris Saviels	6 ft 1 in (185 cm)	203 lb (92 kg)	January 15, 1982 (aged 24)	(Russia) Torpedo Nizhny Novgorod
7	D	Kārlis Skrastiņš (C)	6 ft 2 in (188 cm)	205 lb (93 kg)	July 9, 1974 (aged 31)	(United States) Colorado Avalanche
8	D	Sandis Ozoliņš	6 ft 3 in (191 cm)	214 lb (97 kg)	August 13, 1972 (aged 33)	(United States) Mighty Ducks of Anaheim
9	F	Ģirts Ankipāns	6 ft 1 in (185 cm)	216 lb (98 kg)	November 29, 1975 (aged 30)	(Latvia) HK Riga 2000
10	F	Vladimirs Mamonovs	5 ft 10 in (178 cm)	190 lb (86 kg)	April 22, 1980 (aged 25)	(Latvia) Metalurgs Liepājas
12	F	Herberts Vasiļjevs	5 ft 11 in (180 cm)	192 lb (87 kg)	May 27, 1976 (aged 29)	(Germany) Krefeld Pinguine
13	F	Grigorijs Panteļejevs	5 ft 9 in (175 cm)	185 lb (84 kg)	November 13, 1972 (aged 33)	(Russia) HK Dmitrov
14	F	Leonids Tambijevs	5 ft 9 in (175 cm)	176 lb (80 kg)	September 26, 1970 (aged 35)	(Switzerland) EHC Basel
15	F	Māris Ziediņš	5 ft 10 in (178 cm)	174 lb (79 kg)	July 3, 1978 (aged 27)	(United States) Stockton Thunder
17	F	Aleksandrs Ņiživijs	5 ft 10 in (178 cm)	170 lb (77 kg)	September 16, 1976 (aged 29)	(Russia) Torpedo Nizhny Novgorod
18	D	Georgijs Pujacs	6 ft 1 in (185 cm)	218 lb (99 kg)	July 11, 1981 (aged 24)	(Latvia) HK Riga 2000
21	F	Armands Bērziņš	6 ft 3 in (191 cm)	212 lb (96 kg)	December 27, 1983 (aged 22)	(Latvia) HK Riga 2000
23	D	Atvars Tribuncovs	6 ft 2 in (188 cm)	220 lb (100 kg)	October 14, 1976 (aged 29)	(Sweden) Mora IK
24	F	Miķelis Rēdlihs	5 ft 11 in (180 cm)	183 lb (83 kg)	July 1, 1984 (aged 21)	(Sweden) IF Björklöven
25	D	Krišjānis Rēdlihs	6 ft 2 in (188 cm)	209 lb (95 kg)	January 15, 1981 (aged 25)	(United States) Albany River Rats
27	F	Aleksandrs Semjonovs	5 ft 11 in (180 cm)	201 lb (91 kg)	June 8, 1972 (aged 33)	(Sweden) Malmö Redhawks
29	F	Aigars Cipruss	5 ft 11 in (180 cm)	181 lb (82 kg)	January 12, 1972 (aged 34)	(Latvia) HK Riga 2000
30	G	Sergejs Naumovs	5 ft 10 in (178 cm)	181 lb (82 kg)	August 4, 1969 (aged 36)	(Russia) Khimik Voskresensk
31	G	Edgars Masaļskis	5 ft 9 in (175 cm)	181 lb (82 kg)	March 30, 1981 (aged 24)	(Russia) Neftyanik Almetievsk
47	D	Mārtiņš Cipulis	6 ft 0 in (183 cm)	183 lb (83 kg)	November 29, 1980 (aged 25)	(Latvia) HK Riga 2000

Round-robin

Pos	Team	Pld	W	D	L	GF	GA	GD	Pts	Qualification
1	Slovakia	5	5	0	0	18	8	+10	10	Quarterfinals
2	Russia	5	4	0	1	23	11	+12	8	Quarterfinals
3	Sweden	5	3	0	2	15	12	+3	6	Quarterfinals
4	United States	5	1	1	3	13	13	0	3	Quarterfinals
5	Kazakhstan	5	1	0	4	9	16	−7	2	
6	Latvia	5	0	1	4	11	29	−18	1	

Source: IIHF

15 February 2006; 21:05	Latvia	3–3 (1–2, 2–0, 0–1)	United States	Palasport Olimpico, Turin; Attendance: 7,851

Game reference

Artūrs Irbe
Goalies
John Grahame
Referee:
(Finland) Timo Favorin
Linesmen:
(Germany) Thomas Gemeinhardt
(Canada) Steve Miller

	0–1	9:44 – B. Gionta (J. Liles, S. Gomez) (PP)
	0–2	10:38 – C. Conroy
A. Ņiživijs (S. Ozoliņš) – 13:15	1–2
A. Tribuncovs (S. Ozoliņš, A. Ņiživijs) (PP) – 35:04	2–2
H. Vasiļjevs (R. Laviņš) – 35:44	3–2
	3–3	42:01 – J. Leopold (B. Hedican, C. Conroy)

16 min
Penalties
16 min
25
Shots
42

16 February 2006; 17:05	Slovakia	6–3 (4–1, 1–2, 1–0)	Latvia	Torino Esposizioni, Turin; Attendance: 2,960

Game reference

Ján Lašák
Goalies
Artūrs Irbe
Referee:
(Switzerland) Danny Kurmann
Linesmen:
(Finland) Stefan Fonselius
(Canada) Pierre Racicot

R. Zedník (L. Višňovský) – 5:23	1–0
R. Petrovický (T. Surový, A. Meszároš) – 5:43	2–0
	2–1	6:27 – S. Ozoliņš (M. Cipulis, G. Panteļejevs)
P. Demitra (Mari. Hossa) (SH) – 7:54	3–1
Mari. Hossa – 13:17	4–1
	4–2	20:54 – M. Cipulis (A. Cipruss, G. Panteļejevs)
	4–3	26:51 – A. Ņiživijs (K. Skrastiņš)
Z. Chára (Mari. Hossa) – 33:49	5–3
Mari. Hossa (M. Gáborík) – 49:04	6–3

12 min
Penalties
8 min
25
Shots
28

18 February 2006; 17:05	Sweden	6–1 (1–0, 4–0, 1–1)	Latvia	Palasport Olimpico, Turin; Attendance: 8,795

Game reference

Henrik Lundqvist
Goalies
Sergejs Naumovs
Referee:
(Canada) Paul Devorski
Linesmen:
(Canada) Derek Doucette
(Finland) Antti Hämäläinen

S. Påhlsson (P. Forsberg) – 14:20	1–0
N. Lidström (H. Zetterberg) (PP) – 22:22	2–0
D. Alfredsson (K. Jönsson) (PP) – 24:59	3–0
P. Axelsson (P. Forsberg) (PP) – 25:17	4–0
H. Zetterberg (T. Holmström) – 27:58	5–0
D. Alfredsson (M. Sundin, N. Lidström) – 44:48	6–0
	6–1	49:10 – M. Ziediņš (A. Ņiživijs, S. Ozoliņš)

6 min
Penalties
14 min
40
Shots
14

19 February 2006; 13:05	Russia	9–2 (3–1, 3–0, 3–1)	Latvia	Torino Esposizioni, Turin; Attendance: 4,310

Game reference

Evgeni Nabokov (out 40:00)
Maxim Sokolov (in 40:00)
Goalies
Artūrs Irbe (out 27:58)
Edgars Masaļskis (in 27:58)
Referee:
(United States) Dennis LaRue
Linesmen:
(Czech Republic) Petr Blümel
(Finland) Stefan Fonselius

I. Kovalchuk (A. Kovalev, D. Markov) – 7:26	1–0
M. Sushinsky (A. Kharitonov, S. Gonchar) (PP2) – 9:15	2–0
	2–1	9:55 – A. Cipruss (SH)
I. Kovalchuk (P. Datsyuk) – 12:36	3–1
I. Kovalchuk (A. Kovalev, P. Datsyuk) – 23:32	4–1
V. Kozlov (A. Yashin) – 25:45	5–1
I. Kovalchuk (P. Datsyuk) – 35:16	6–1
A. Yashin (V. Kozlov, S. Zhukov) – 41:58	7–1
E. Malkin (M. Sushinsky, V. Vishnevski) – 47:32	8–1
A. Ovechkin (V. Kozlov, A. Yashin) – 56:27	9–1
	9–2	58:04 – M. Rēdlihs (A. Bērziņš)

16 min
Penalties
18 min
39
Shots
11

21 February 2006; 11:35	Latvia	2–5 (1–1, 0–1, 1–3)	Kazakhstan	Torino Esposizioni, Turin; Attendance: 2,300

Game reference

Sergejs Naumovs
Goalies
Vitali Yeremeyev
Referee:
(Sweden) Christer Lärking
Linesmen:
(Canada) Derek Doucette
(Germany) Thomas Gemeinhardt

	0–1	7:20 – A. Koreshkov (E. Koreshkov)
L. Tambijevs (A. Ņiživijs) (PP) – 15:13	1–1
	1–2	35:04 – N. Antropov (E. Koreshkov)
A. Cipruss (G. Panteļejevs, A. Tribuncovs) – 45:04	2–2
	2–3	52:33 – S. Alexandrov (F. Polishchuk, A. Troschinsky)
	2–4	54:53 – E. Koreshkov (PS)
	2–5	58:08 – E. Koreshkov (A. Koreshkov)

14 min
Penalties
6 min
32
Shots
30

== Luge ==
Athlete	Event	Final					
Athlete	Event	Run 1	Run 2	Run 3	Run 4	Total	Rank
Aiva Aparjode	Women's singles	48.934	47.957	47.721	48.453	3:13.065	18
Kaspars Dumpis	Men's singles	52.432	52.063	52.391	52.402	3:29.288	17
Anna Orlova	Women's singles	47.654	47.317	47.280	47.232	3:09.483	7
Guntis Rēķis	Men's singles	52.769	52.338	52.307	52.742	3:30.156	21
Mārtiņš Rubenis	Men's singles	51.913	51.497	51.561	51.474	3:26.445	Bronze medal
Maija Tīruma	Women's singles	49.623	47.987	47.889	47.545	3:13.044	17
Andris Šics; Juris Šics	Doubles	47.353	47.761	n/a		1:35.114	7

== Short track speed skating ==
Athlete	Event	Heat		Quarterfinal		Semifinal		Final	
Athlete	Event	Time	Rank	Time	Rank	Time	Rank	Time	Rank
Evita Krievāne	Women's 1000 m	1:39.986	3	did not advance					19
Evita Krievāne	Women's 1500 m	2:34.171	5	did not advance					23

== Skeleton ==
Athlete	Event	Final			
Athlete	Event	Run 1	Run 2	Total	Rank
Martins Dukurs	Men's	58.79	58.60	1:57.39	7
