= Luge at the 1994 Winter Olympics – Doubles =

Doubles at the XVII Olympic Winter Games
- Venue: Lillehammer Olympic Bobsleigh and Luge Track
- Dates: 18 February 1994
- Competitors: 40 from 15 nations
- Winning time: 1:36.720

Medalists
1st place, gold medalist(s)		Italy; Kurt Brugger, Wilfried Huber
2nd place, silver medalist(s)		Italy; Hansjörg Raffl, Norbert Huber
3rd place, bronze medalist(s)		Germany; Stefan Krauße, Jan Behrendt

The Doubles luge competition at the 1994 Winter Olympics in Lillehammer was held on 18 February, at Lillehammer Olympic Bobsleigh and Luge Track. Prior to these Games, the International Luge Federation changed the doubles from a men's event to an open event, allowing men and women to race together. However, no women competed in this event during these Games.

== Results ==
Rank	Bib	Athletes	Country	Run 1	Run 2	Total
1st place, gold medalist(s)	11	Kurt Brugger; Wilfried Huber	Italy	48.348	48.372	1:36.720
2nd place, silver medalist(s)	9	Hansjörg Raffl; Norbert Huber	Italy	48.274	48.495	1:36.769
3rd place, bronze medalist(s)	5	Stefan Krauße; Jan Behrendt	Germany	48.364	48.581	1:36.945
4	17	Mark Grimmette; Jonathan Edwards	United States	48.617	48.672	1:37.289
5	1	Chris Thorpe; Gordy Sheer	United States	48.571	48.725	1:37.296
6	8	Ioan Apostol; Liviu Cepoi	Romania	48.647	48.676	1:37.323
7	7	Albert Demchenko; Aleksey Zelensky	Russia	48.655	48.882	1:37.537
8	20	Bob Gasper; Clay Ives	Canada	48.728	48.963	1:37.691
8	4	Ihor Urbanskiy; Andriy Mukhin	Ukraine	48.899	48.792	1:37.691
10	6	Tobias Schiegl; Markus Schiegl	Austria	48.802	48.893	1:37.695
11	3	Aivis Švāns; Roberts Suharevs	Latvia	48.949	48.918	1:37.867
12	16	Juris Vovčoks; Dairis Leksis	Latvia	49.014	49.201	1:38.215
13	18	Hans Kohala; Carl-Johan Lindqvist	Sweden	48.970	49.268	1:38.238
14	10	Steffen Skel; Steffen Wöller	Germany	49.217	49.091	1:38.308
15	19	Anatoly Bobkov; Gennady Belyakov	Russia	49.296	49.384	1:38.680
16	12	Leszek Szarejko; Adrian Przechewka	Poland	49.104	49.800	1:38.904
17	14	Levan Tibilov; Kakha Vakhtangishvili	Georgia	49.880	49.504	1:39.384
18	13	Atsushi Sasaki; Yuji Sasaki	Japan	50.782	49.342	1:40.124
19	15	Ilko Karacholov; Ivan Karacholov	Bulgaria	50.936	50.827	1:41.763
-	2	Harald Rolfsen; Lars-Marius Waldal	Norway	DQ	-	-
