= Evija =

Female given name

Evija is a Latvian female given name.

It may refer to:

== People ==
- Evija Āzace (born 1976), Latvian basketball player
- Evija Papule, Latvian politician, a representative for Livonia (Saeima constituency)
- Evija Ručevska, Latvian beauty pageant contestant, Mis Latvija 1998, who withdrew from Miss World 1998 and competed at the Miss World 1999
- Evija Sloka, Latvian musician who competed to represent Latvia in the Eurovision Song Contest 2011
- Evija Smagare, songwriter whose song competed to represent Latvia in the Eurovision Song Contest 2022
- Evija Šulce (born 1970), Latvian luger
- Evija Tētiņa, Latvian hockey player who was named best goaltender at the 2014 IIHF Women's World Championship Division I
