= Didzis =

Male given name

- Gender: Male
- Name day: 6 May

Origin
- Origin: Old High German
- Region of origin: Latvia

Other names
- Related names: Dītrihs, Didrikis

Didzis is a Latvian masculine given name of Old High German origin. It is occasionally a diminutive of the names Dītrihs and Didrikis. It is a cognate to the German name Dietrich. The first recorded usage of the name in the areas of modern-day Latvia date from the early 19th-century.

Individuals bearing the name Didzis include:

- Didzis Gavars (born 1966), Latvian politician
- Didzis Matīss (born 1980), Latvian football manager
- Didzis Skuška (born 1968), Latvian bobsledder
