= Volfs =

Volfs, feminine: Volfa is a Latvian surname, the Latvianization of the surname Wolf. Notable people with the surname include:

- Estere Volfa (born 2005), Latvian biathlete and former cross-country skier
- Ieva Cederštrēma-Volfa (born 1969), Latvian biathlete
