= Suharevs =

Suharevs is a surname. Notable people with the surname include:

- Ritvars Suharevs (born 1999), Latvian weightlifter
- Roberts Suharevs (born 1970), Latvian luger
