= List of Latvian records in speed skating =

The following are the national records in speed skating in Latvia maintained by Latvian Skating Association (LSA).

== Men ==
| Event | Record | Athlete | Date | Meet | Place | Ref |
|---|---|---|---|---|---|---|
| 500 meters | 35.32 | Haralds Silovs | 27 January 2013 | World Sprint Championships | Salt Lake City, United States | |
| 500 meters × 2 | | | | | | |
| 1000 meters | 1:07.47 | Haralds Silovs | 26 January 2013 | World Sprint Championships | Salt Lake City, United States | |
| 1500 meters | 1:43.35 | Haralds Silovs | 9 December 2017 | World Cup | Salt Lake City, United States | |
| 3000 meters | 3:43.43 | Haralds Silovs | 7 August 2009 | Summer Classic | Calgary, Canada | |
| 5000 meters | 6:15.60 | Haralds Silovs | 10 December 2017 | World Cup | Salt Lake City, United States | |
| 10000 meters | 13:43.66 | Haralds Silovs | 19 February 2012 | World Allround Championships | Moscow, Russia | |
| Team pursuit (8 laps) | | | | | | |
| Sprint combination | 138.515 pts | Haralds Silovs | 26–27 January 2013 | World Sprint Championships | Salt Lake City, United States | |
| Small combination | | | | | | |
| Big combination | 151.267 pts | Haralds Silovs | 2–3 March 2019 | World Allround Championships | Calgary, Canada | |

== Women ==
| Event | Record | Athlete | Date | Meet | Place | Ref |
|---|---|---|---|---|---|---|
| 500 meters | 40.98 | Ilonda Lūse | 15 March 2001 | Olympic Oval Final | Calgary, Canada | |
| 500 meters × 2 | | | | | | |
| 1000 meters | 1:19.77 | Ilonda Lūse | 18 March 2001 | Olympic Oval Final | Calgary, Canada | |
| 1500 meters | 2:02.63 | Ilonda Lūse | 16 March 2001 | Olympic Oval Final | Calgary, Canada | |
| 3000 meters | 4:17.96 | Ilonda Lūse | 4 November 2000 | Weekend Races | Calgary, Canada | |
| 5000 meters | 7:26.24 | Ilonda Lūse | 16 March 2001 | Olympic Oval Final | Calgary, Canada | |
| 10000 meters | | | | | | |
| Team pursuit (6 laps) | | | | | | |
| Sprint combination | | | | | | |
| Mini combination | | | | | | |
| Small combination | | | | | | |
