= Ilze Ābola =

Latvian alpine skier (born 1978)

Personal information
- Nationality: Latvian
- Born: May 15, 1978 (age 48) Cēsis, Cēsu novads, Latvian SSR, Soviet Union
- Height: 1.69 m (5 ft 7 in)
- Weight: 60 kg (132 lb)

Sport
- Sport: Alpine skiing

Ilze Ābola (born 15 May 1978) is a Latvian alpine skier. She competed in the 1998 Winter Olympics. Trained under Aldis Fimbauers and Jānis Ciaguns, multiple Latvian champion. In 1998, at the age of 19, she represented Latvia at the 1998 Winter Olympics, finishing 31st in the giant slalom.
