= Robert Gasper =

Canadian luger (born 1958)

Robert Gasper (born October 1, 1958 in Humboldt, Saskatchewan) is a Canadian luge athlete who competed in doubles luge from the late 1980s to the mid-1990s.

Competing in three Winter Olympics (1988, 1992, 1994), Gasper earned his best finish of eighth (tied with Ukraine) in the men's Luge at the doubles event at Lillehammer, Norway in the 1994 Winter Olympics.

Gasper married Betty Smith in 1988 in Lloydminster, Alberta. They live in Calgary, Alberta. He has one child.
