= Aivis Švāns =

Latvian luger (born 1969)

Personal information
- Nationality: Latvian
- Born: 2 May 1969 (age 56); Cēsis, Latvia

Sport
- Sport: Luge

Aivis Švāns (born 2 May 1969) is a Latvian luger. He competed in the men's doubles event at the 1994 Winter Olympics. His wife is Evija Šulce.
