= Cēsis Concert Hall =

Concert hall in Latvia

- Vidzemes koncertzāle "Cēsis"
- The Vidzeme Concert Hall Cēsis
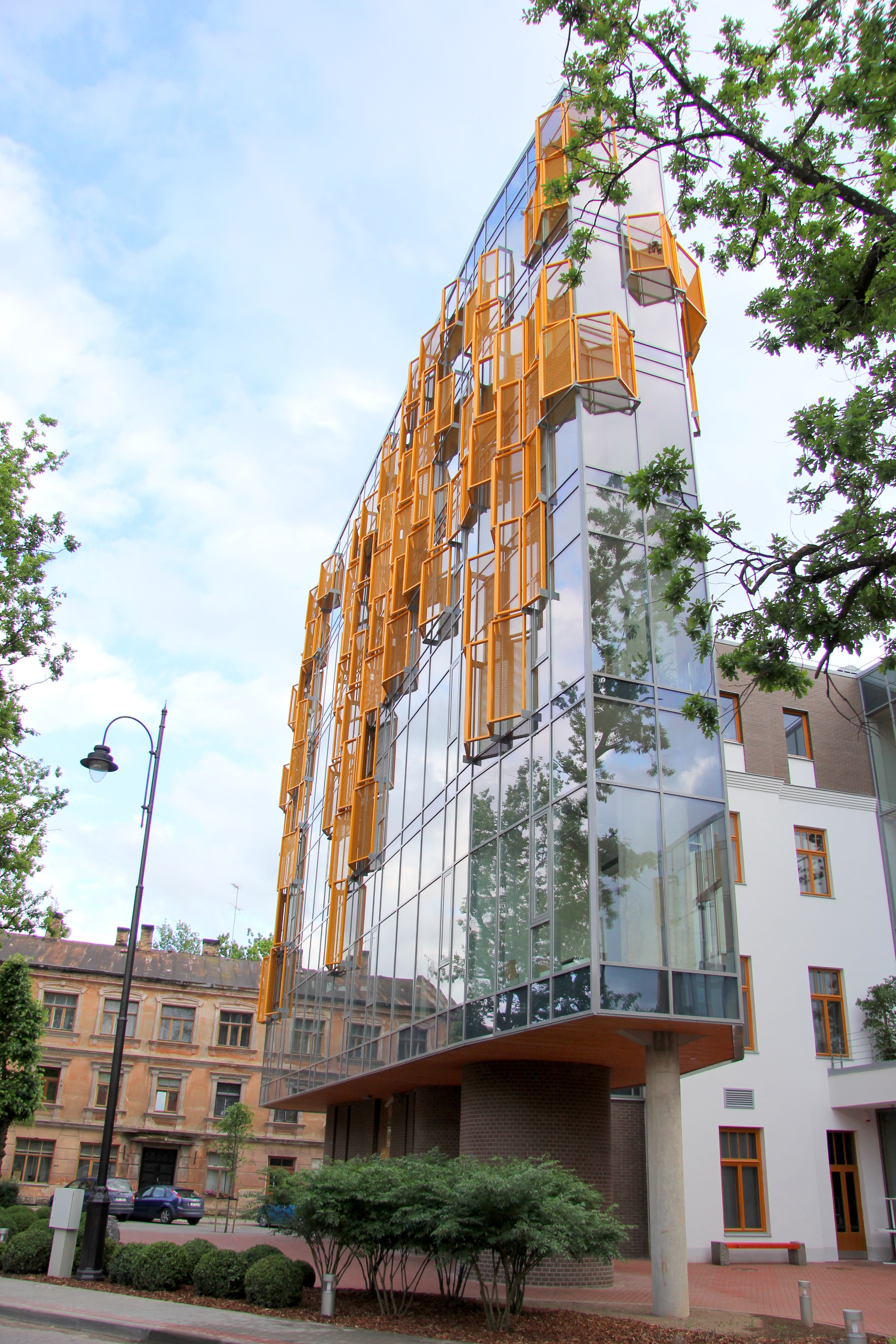
- Interactive map of Cēsis Concert Hall
- Address: 12, Raunas iela, Cēsis, Cēsis county, Vidzeme, LV-4101, Latvia; Cēsis; Latvia
- Coordinates: 57°18′48″N 25°16′35″E
- Owner: Cēsis Municipality
- Capacity: 800
- Current use: Multi-functional cultural centre

Construction
- Opened: May 31, 2014
- Years active: 2014–present
- Architect: Juris Poga

Website
- cesukoncertzale.lv/en/par_koncertzali/

Vidzeme Concert Hall "Cēsis" (Latvian: Vidzemes koncertzāle "Cēsis", also known as the Vidzemes koncertzāle) is an 800-seat regional multifunctional music and culture centre located on Rauna street in Cēsis, Vidzeme, Latvia. The Centre hosts classical and contemporary music concerts, theatre performances, film screenings, art exhibitions, seminars and conferences. Constructed in 2011-2014 it provides a venue for Regional amateur art collectives. and Cēsis Music Secondary School (Latvian: Alfrēda Kalniņa mūzikas vidusskola). The centre is owned by Cēsis municipality.

The Vidzeme Concert Hall has hosted notable national and international performers, such as Gideon Kromer, Nicholas Alstein and Didier Lockwood. The concert hall is home for festivals – Cesis Art Festival (Latvian: Cēsu Mākslas festivāls), Cello Cesis (Latvian: Starptautiskais čella mūzikas festivāls Čello Cēsis), Peteris Vasks Festival (Latvian: Pētera Vaska festivāls).

== Background and construction ==
The explanation of the name of the concert hall is - "Vidzeme" stands for the regional status of the institution. "Concert hall" represents its multifunctionality, but "Cēsis" represents the location of the concert hall.

The Vidzeme Concert Hall Cēsis was built to fill the need for academic music, theatre, opera, ballet etc., for the citizens of Cesis region. It was originally planned to build a separate building for the concert hall and to leave the Houses of the Viceroy Society (Latvian Cēsu Viesīgās Biedrības nams), which served as a cultural centre since 1915, for theatre performances. It was eventually decided to reconstruct the building.

The concert hall was designed by the architect Juris Poga in 2007[8] whose previous work includes the reconstruction of the Mežaparks Great Bandstand (Latvian: Mežaparka Lielā estrāde) from 2016 till 2018.

The building of the concert hall began in July 2011 and was finished in April 2014. The total costs were 13 857 420,06 EUR. The foundation stone was laid in 2009 and it was opened on 31 May 2014.

The Concert Hall Cēsis is owned by Cēsis Municipality and LLC “Vidzemes koncertzāle” manages the building.

== Architecture ==
The concert hall is a six-storey building.

Exposed materials are seen all over the new facade – brick wall, natural stone, wood, concrete, metal. In contrast to that, old construction technique – painted wall plaster, was kept in parts of the historic building. The building includes wood shields of the entrance lobby walls, great hall chandeliers with ceiling rosettes, metal railings of the old stairs, lobby pillars, as well as the only remaining door from 1914.

The shutters of the concert hall are made of metal instead of wood, as it was planned at the beginning, to ensure long-term exploitation. The shutters serve as natural shaders and design elements. The location and colour of the shutters admit the concept of the building – to create a wood symbol to the new building. The location of the shutters is designed like foliage - with a thicker or smaller crown. The colour of the shutters changes in different lighting during day time.

== Performance Halls and Facilities ==
The Cēsis Concert Hall is a multifunctional centre. The complex hosts Cēsis Music Secondary School, premises for rehearsals of Cēsis region amateur art collectives and chamber orchestra of Vidzeme, the office of the Cēsis Municipal Agency "Cēsis Culture and Tourism centre", the office of LLC “Vidzemes koncertzāle”, restaurant and café, concert halls, exhibition hall, organ hall. The concert hall owns the "Steinway" piano. The "Steinway" piano was brought from Hamburg by Jānis Maļeckis who is a professor at Jāzeps Vītols Latvian Academy of Music.

Premises are rented to seminars and corporate events to earn and pay exploitation fees. The childcare room is set up in the concert hall to provide parents to enjoy culture while their children are looked after.

=== The Great Auditorium ===
The auditorium hosts concerts, theatre and dance performances, conferences and social events. The auditorium provides 805 seats: 504 in the stalls and 301 in the balcony, but the number of seats can be changed and adjusted to suit the character of the event. In the front part of the hall, in the front of stage, is a raised platform which can be modified as an orchestra platform, an extension of stage or as an extension of the hall to provide more seats, a platform for supply transport to access to warehouses which are located under the Great hall, or The Small Auditorium which is in the basement. The Great Auditorium has natural acoustics. The reverb time is approximately 2 seconds

=== The Cinema or Small Auditorium ===
The auditorium hosts film screenings, concerts, theatre, as well as conferences and presentations. Seats are in terraforms. The auditorium provides 100 seats

=== The Chamber Auditorium ===
The hall is suitable for acoustic concerts, conferences, seminars and celebrations. It provides 100 seats.

=== The Organ Auditorium ===
Auditorium is suitable for concerts, seminars, meetings and talks. It is named after historic organ which is restored under the management of Master Janis Kalnins in Ugāle. The organ was a present from the Lübeck Academy of Music in 1999 to Cēsis Music Secondary School

=== The Exhibition Hall ===
The Exhibition Auditorium is suitable for exhibitions, seminars, meetings and talks.

=== Cēsis Music Secondary School ===
Cesis Music Secondary School (Latvian Alfrēda Kalniņa mūzikas vidusskola) was named after Alfrēds Kalniņš. It was founded in 1925. Cēsis Music Secondary school is a vocational education institution subordinate to the Ministry of Culture in which children and adolescents (ages 6–20) can attain education in various fields and genres of music and dance.
