= Māris Lēģeris =

Latvian luger (born 1977)

Personal information
- Nationality: Latvian
- Born: 29 July 1977 (age 47); Cēsis, Latvia

Sport
- Sport: Luge

Māris Lēģeris (born 29 July 1977) is a Latvian luger. He competed in the men's doubles event at the 1998 Winter Olympics.
