= Anatoly Bobkov =

Russian luger (born 1967)

Personal information
- Nationality: Russian
- Born: 7 February 1967 (age 58)

Sport
- Sport: Luge

Anatoly Bobkov (born 7 February 1967) is a Russian luger. He competed in the men's doubles event at the 1994 Winter Olympics.
