= Kakha Vakhtangishvili =

Georgian luger (born 1970)

Personal information
- Nationality: Georgian
- Born: 2 April 1970 (age 55); Bakuriani, Georgian SSR, Soviet Union

Sport
- Sport: Luge

Kakha Vakhtangishvili (born 2 April 1970) is a Georgian luger. He competed in the men's doubles event at the 1994 Winter Olympics.
