= Ulla Ģērmane =

Latvian alpine skier (born 1971)

Personal information
- Nationality: (Latvia) Latvian
- Born: October 21, 1971 (age 54) Valmiera, Latvian SSR, Soviet Union
- Relatives: Rodžers Lodziņš (brother); Dženifera Ģērmane (daughter); Evert Ģērmanis (son)

Sport
- Sport: Skiing

World Cup career
- Seasons: 1988–1990 (World Cup)
- Indiv. podiums: 1 (bronze at 1988 World Junior Championships)

Ulla Ģērmane (née Lodziņa, born 1971) is a former Latvian alpine skier, now a skiing coach.

== Achievements ==
She won the bronze medal in the downhill at the 1988 World Junior Championships and also competed in four other events, in addition to placing tenth in the downhill at the 1989 World Junior Championships.

She placed fourteenth in the downhill at the 1989 World Championships and competed in World Cup between 1988 and 1990, reaching as high as 4th place in February 1989 in Steamboat Springs.

== Family ==
Her brother Rodžers is a former alpine skier, later a bobsledder. Her daughter Dženifera Ģērmane is also an alpine skier. Her son Evert also trains in this sport.
