= LAMPA Conversation Festival =

Annual public discussion festival in Cēsis, Latvia

LAMPA Conversation Festival Sarunu festivāls LAMPA
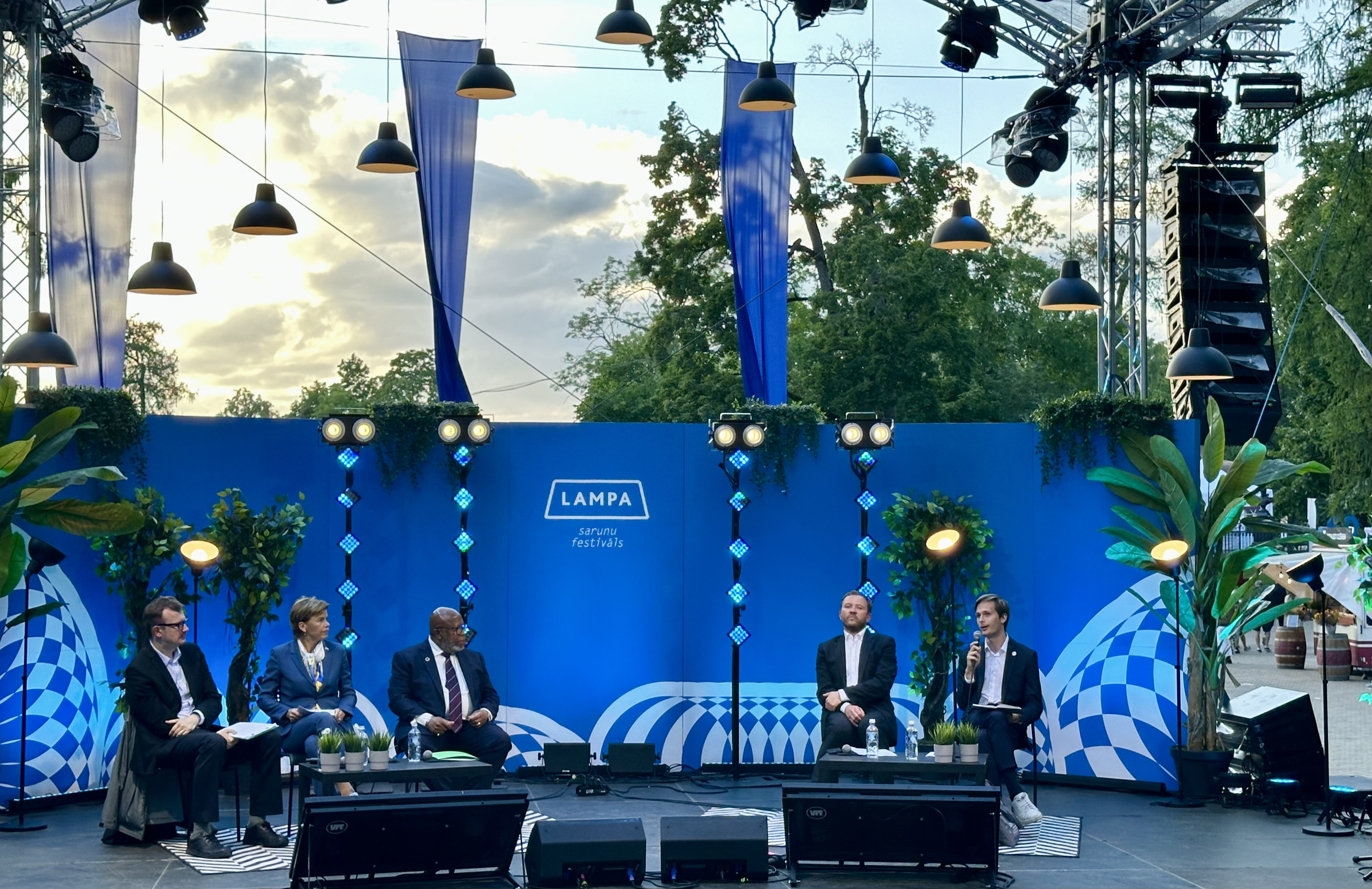
- The festival in Cēsis in 2024
- Genre: Public discussion and democracy festival
- Frequency: Annual
- Venue: Cēsis Castle Park
- Locations: Cēsis, Latvia
- Years active: 2015-present
- Inaugurated: 3 July 2015
- Website: festivalslampa.lv

The LAMPA Conversation Festival (Latvian: Sarunu festivāls LAMPA) is an annual public discussion and democracy festival held in Cēsis, Latvia. It normally takes place over two days in Cēsis Castle Park and is free to attend. Its programme is created by civil-society organisations, public institutions, companies, universities, media organisations, political parties and individuals, and includes debates, talks, workshops, performances and other events in Latvian, English and Russian.

The inaugural event in 2015 was presented as Latvia's first conversation festival and drew about 3,500 visitors to approximately 60 events. Attendance at the tenth edition in 2024 exceeded 25,000. In 2023, LAMPA received the European Citizen's Prize from the European Parliament.

== History ==
=== Establishment ===
LAMPA was developed by the Foundation for an Open Society DOTS with partners in Cēsis and the private sector. Its organisers drew on the tradition of democracy festivals in the Nordic countries and Estonia, where public institutions, political organisations and civil society meet in an informal setting. Cēsis was selected partly because of the setting of its castle park, its proximity to Riga and the support of the local municipality.

The first festival took place on 3 and 4 July 2015. Its announced programme included three stages and 50 events involving journalists, politicians, actors, comedians and civic organisations. The programme combined discussions of democracy and social issues with workshops and cultural performances, and admission was free.

=== Growth ===
The second edition in 2016 attracted about 9,000 visitors, with 150 events produced by 80 organisations. By 2018, attendance had risen to more than 16,000, while a further 47,000 people followed events through online streams. The fourth edition included more than 270 activities, with its programme organised around the theme of trust.

The fifth edition in 2019 drew more than 20,000 visitors. Around 1,500 speakers appeared on 38 stages, producing nearly 720 hours of programming; online broadcasts received about 70,000 views. Its programme had expanded to more than 350 events, covering topics including mental health, regional development, taxation, security, media, technology and biodiversity.

=== Pandemic adaptations ===
The COVID-19 pandemic in Latvia led to a different format in 2020. Instead of a two-day event concentrated in Cēsis, LAMPA ran from 2 to 5 September at locations across Latvia, with every event streamed online and some sessions held entirely through videoconferencing platforms. Recordings of 220 events were subsequently made available in an online archive, mostly in Latvian, with some content in English and Russian.

In 2021 the festival again centred on Cēsis but combined in-person attendance, livestreaming and communal viewing sites elsewhere in Latvia. Its programme contained more than 200 events and used respect as its main theme. The usual two-day in-person format returned in 2022, when approximately 19,000 people attended 270 events.

=== Later editions ===
The ninth festival in 2023 attracted more than 20,000 people to 323 events at 55 stages and venues. Later that month, the festival was named one of Latvia's recipients of the European Citizen's Prize, which recognises projects contributing to European cooperation, common values and fundamental rights.

The tenth edition in 2024 comprised 365 events at 62 venues and drew more than 25,000 visitors. In 2025, the festival attracted more than 20,000 visitors to 376 events at 61 venues. Its programme was prepared by 285 event organisers and included 1,275 speakers and participants from Latvia and abroad.

The twelfth edition was held on 10 and 11 July 2026. It included 409 events at 66 venues, with 1,445 speakers, and was reported to have attracted approximately 27,000 visitors.

== Programme and organisation ==
LAMPA operates as an open programme platform. Organisations and individuals propose individual events or larger programmes, while the festival's central team coordinates the overall programme and venue. Participants have included non-governmental organisations, state and municipal institutions, businesses, media outlets, universities, political parties and individual citizens. Events range from formal debates, interviews and panel discussions to lectures, workshops, performances, stand-up comedy and activities for children.

Political debates and meetings with public officials form part of the programme. Recurring formats have included the Politicians' Roast (Latvian: Politiķu cepiens), in which public officials answer questions in a comedic format, and a Political Arena where visitors can meet representatives of political parties. The festival also offers children's programming under the name miniLAMPA.

The Foundation for an Open Society DOTS is the festival's principal organiser and works with Cēsis Municipality and a group of private and institutional partners. The British Council became a strategic partner in 2016 and has supported both the festival and related discussion programmes in other parts of Latvia.

The programme includes events in Latvian, English and Russian, sometimes with interpretation. Many sessions are livestreamed and later retained in the festival's video archive.
