= Raivis Zīmelis =

Latvian biathlete (born 1976)

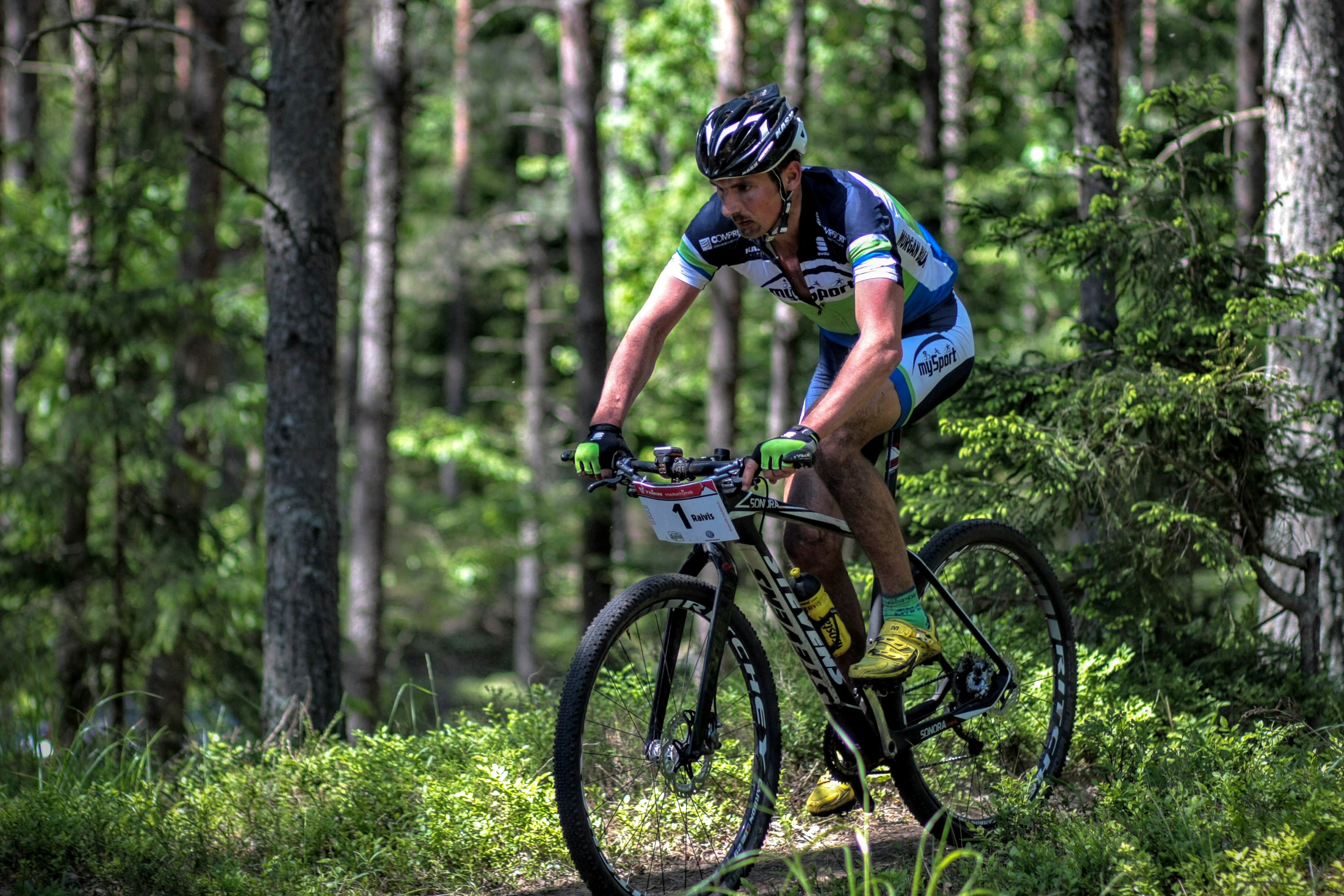
- Raivis Zīmelis in 2015

Personal information
- Nationality: Latvian
- Born: 18 August 1976 (age 48); Madona, Latvia

Sport
- Sport: Biathlon

Raivis Zīmelis (born 18 August 1976) is a Latvian biathlete. He competed in the men's sprint event at the 2006 Winter Olympics. He ended his professional career in 2006. Later he turned to Mountain bike racing and became a Latvian champion in 2015.
