= Dans Jansons =

Latvian freestyle skier

Personal information
- Nationality: Latvian
- Born: 21 May 1966 (age 58); Jelgava, Latvia

Sport
- Sport: Freestyle skiing

Dans Jansons (born 21 May 1966) is a Latvian freestyle skier. He competed in the men's moguls event at the 1992 Winter Olympics.
