= Intars Spalviņš =

Latvian cross-country skier (born 1980)

Personal information
- Nationality: Latvian
- Born: 20 December 1980 (age 44); Jelgava, Latvia

Sport
- Sport: Cross-country skiing

Intars Spalviņš (born 20 December 1980) is a Latvian cross-country skier. He competed in the men's sprint event at the 2006 Winter Olympics.
