= Valts Eiduks =

Latvian cross-country skier (born 1986)

Personal information
- Nationality: Latvian
- Born: 21 October 1986 (age 38); Jēkabpils, Latvia

Sport
- Sport: Cross-country skiing

Valts Eiduks (born 21 October 1986) is a Latvian cross-country skier. He competed in the men's sprint event at the 2006 Winter Olympics.
