= Jānis Elsiņš =

Latvian bobsledder

Personal information
- Nationality: Latvian
- Born: 7 February 1974 (age 51); Sigulda, Latvia
- Height: 184 cm (6 ft 0 in)
- Weight: 95 kg (209 lb)

Sport
- Sport: Bobsleigh

Jānis Elsiņš (born 7 February 1974) is a Latvian bobsledder. He competed in the two man and the four man events at the 1998 Winter Olympics.
