= Rodžers Lodziņš =

Latvian bobsledder

Personal information
- Nationality: Latvian
- Born: 11 December 1969 (age 55); Valmiera, Latvia

Sport
- Sport: Bobsleigh

Rodžers Lodziņš (born 11 December 1969) is a Latvian former bobsledder. He competed in the two man event at the 1998 Winter Olympics. He won three silver medals (1989, 1993 and 1994) in Junior World Championships for bobsleigh. In 2016, he started coaching for the Latvian Skeleton Team. His sister Ulla is a former alpine skier.
