= Normunds Aplociņš =

Latvian freestyle skier

Personal information
- Nationality: Latvian
- Born: 2 June 1969 (age 56) Sigulda, Latvian SSR, Soviet Union

Sport
- Sport: Freestyle skiing

Normunds Aplociņš (born 2 June 1969) is a Latvian freestyle skier. He competed in the men's moguls event at the 1992 Winter Olympics.
