= Jurita Šnitko =

Latvian luger

Personal information
- Nationality: Latvian
- Born: 30 July 1976 (age 48); Sigulda, Latvia
- Height: 171 cm (5 ft 7 in)
- Weight: 67 kg (148 lb)

Sport
- Sport: Luge

Jurita Šnitko (born 30 July 1976) is a Latvian luger. She competed in the women's singles event at the 1998 Winter Olympics.
