= Oļegs Andrejevs =

Latvian cross-country skier (born 1980)

Personal information
- Nationality: Latvian
- Born: 12 September 1980 (age 44); Krāslavas novads, Latvia

Sport
- Sport: Cross-country skiing

Oļegs Andrejevs (born 12 September 1980) is a Latvian cross-country skier. He competed in the men's sprint event at the 2006 Winter Olympics.
