= Egils Bojārs =

Latvian bobsledder (born 1968)

Personal information
- Nationality: Latvian
- Born: 13 December 1968 (age 56); Līvāni, Latvia
- Height: 187 cm (6 ft 2 in)
- Weight: 94 kg (207 lb)

Sport
- Sport: Bobsleigh

Egils Bojārs (born 13 December 1968) is a Latvian bobsledder. He competed in the four man event at the 1998 Winter Olympics.
