= Evija Āzace =

Latvian basketball player

Personal information
- Born: 9 April 1976 (age 50) Riga, Latvian SSR, Soviet Union
- Listed height: 1.95 m (6 ft 5 in)
- Position: Center

Career history
- ?: Limoges
- ?: Mondeville
- ?: Challes
- 2007-2009: Nice

Evija Āzace (born 9 April 1976) is a former Latvian female professional basketball player.
