= Lars-Marius Waldal =

Norwegian luger (born 1973)

Personal information
- Born: 21 September 1973 (age 52) Oslo, Norway

Sport
- Sport: Luge

Lars-Marius Waldal (born 21 September 1973) is a Norwegian luger, born in Oslo. He competed at the 1994 Winter Olympics in Lillehammer.
