= Aivars Polis =

Latvian luger (born 1972)

Personal information
- Nationality: Latvian
- Born: 3 March 1972 (age 53); Auce, Latvia

Sport
- Sport: Luge

Aivars Polis (born 3 March 1972) is a Latvian luger. He competed in the men's doubles event at the 1992 Winter Olympics.
