= Ivars Bērzups =

Latvian bobsledder (born 1963)

Personal information
- Nationality: Latvian
- Born: 19 January 1963 (age 62); Valmiera, Latvian SSR, Soviet Union

Sport
- Sport: Bobsleigh

Ivars Bērzups (born 19 January 1963) is a Latvian former bobsledder and businessman. He competed at the 1984 Winter Olympics and the 1988 Winter Olympics, representing the Soviet Union, and at the 1992 Winter Olympics, representing Latvia. In the 2009 Latvian municipal elections, he ran in the Babīte County Council elections as a member of Demokrāti.lv, but was not elected.
