= Didzis Gavars =

Latvian politician

Didzis Gavars (born 18 November 1966, Jūrmala, Latvian SSR) is a Latvian politician who was Minister of Health of Latvia from 13 May to 3 November 2010.
