= Aivars Bogdanovs =

Latvian biathlete (born 1965)

Personal information
- Nationality: Latvian
- Born: 27 February 1965 (age 60); Cēsis, Latvia

Sport
- Sport: Biathlon

Aivars Bogdanovs (born 27 February 1965) is a Latvian biathlete. He competed at the 1992 Winter Olympics and the 1994 Winter Olympics.
