= Jēkabs Nākums =

Latvian biathlete (born 1972)

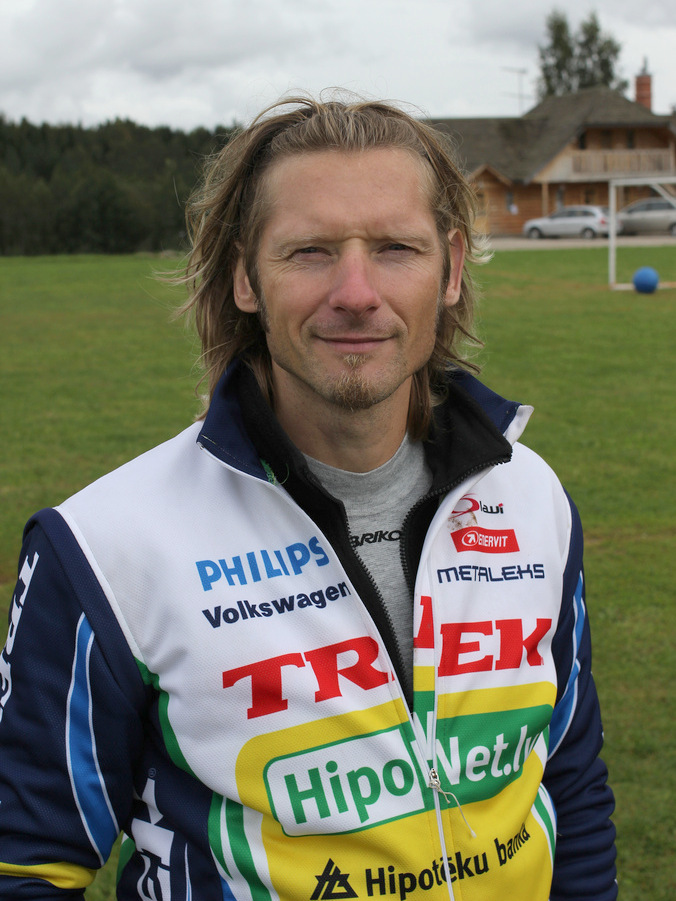
- Jēkabs Nākums in 2010

Personal information
- Nationality: Latvian
- Born: 4 February 1972 (age 54) Priekule, Latvia

Sport
- Sport: Biathlon

Jēkabs Nākums (born 4 February 1972) is a Latvian biathlete. He competed at the 1998 Winter Olympics and the 2002 Winter Olympics. After retiring he is working as a fitness coach and biatlhon coach in a private Latvian team Ogres biatlona klubs.
