= Juris Ģērmanis =

Latvian cross-country skier (born 1977)

Personal information
- Nationality: Latvian
- Born: 4 April 1977 (age 47); Riga, Latvia
- Height: 186 cm (6 ft 1 in)
- Weight: 79 kg (174 lb)

Sport
- Sport: Cross-country skiing

Juris Ģērmanis (born 4 April 1977) is a Latvian cross-country skier. He competed at the 1998 Winter Olympics and the 2002 Winter Olympics.
