= Otomārs Rihters =

Latvian bobsledder

Personal information
- Nationality: Latvian
- Born: 14 November 1963 (age 61); Rēzekne, Latvia

Sport
- Sport: Bobsleigh

Otomārs Rihters (born 14 November 1963) is a Latvian bobsledder. He competed at the 1992 Winter Olympics and the 1994 Winter Olympics.
