= Aldis Intlers =

Latvian bobsledder

Personal information
- Born: 24 April 1965 Liepāja
- Died: 28 August 1994 (aged 29)
Medal record
Bobsleigh
Representing Latvia
World Championships
Bronze medal – third place	1989 Cortina d'Ampezzo	Two-man

Aldis Intlers (24 April 1965 in Liepāja – 28 August 1994) was a Latvian-born Soviet bobsledder who competed from the late 1980s to the mid-1990s. He won a bronze medal in the two-man event at the 1989 FIBT World Championships in Cortina d'Ampezzo.

Competing in two Winter Olympics, Intlers earned his best finish of 11th in the two-man event at Lillehammer in 1994.

Intlers died 28 August 1994 in a car accident, he was 30 years old.
