= Boriss Artemjevs =

Latvian bobsledder (born 1965)

Personal information
- Nationality: Latvian
- Born: 19 January 1965 (age 60); Riga, Latvia

Sport
- Sport: Bobsleigh

Boriss Artemjevs (born 19 January 1965) is a Latvian bobsledder. He competed at the 1992 Winter Olympics and the 1994 Winter Olympics.
