= Adris Plūksna =

Latvian bobsledder

Personal information
- Born: 1 January 1967 (age 58); Ventspils, Latvia
- Height: 187 cm (6 ft 2 in)
- Weight: 83 kg (183 lb)

Sport
- Country: Latvia
- Sport: Bobsleigh

Adris Plūksna (born 1 January 1967) is a Latvian bobsledder. He competed at the 1992 Winter Olympics and the 1994 Winter Olympics.
