= Didzis Skuška =

Latvian bobsledder

Personal information
- Nationality: Latvian
- Born: 18 July 1968 (age 56); Jūrmala, Latvia

Sport
- Sport: Bobsleigh

Didzis Skuška (born 18 July 1968) is a Latvian bobsledder. He competed in the four man event at the 1994 Winter Olympics.
