= Māris Rozentāls =

Latvian bobsledder

Personal information
- Nationality: Latvian
- Born: 29 October 1974 (age 50); Mālpils, Latvia

Sport
- Sport: Bobsleigh

Māris Rozentāls (born 29 October 1974) is a Latvian bobsledder. He competed at the 1998 Winter Olympics and the 2002 Winter Olympics.
