= Agris Elerts =

Latvian luger (born 1967)

Personal information
- Nationality: Latvian
- Born: 17 June 1967 (age 57); Ilūkste, Latvia

Sport
- Sport: Luge

Agris Elerts (born 17 June 1967) is a Latvian luger. He competed at the 1992 Winter Olympics and the 1994 Winter Olympics.

At the 1991-92 Luge World Cup stop in Lake Placid, New York, Elerts won Latvia's first luge medal in 50 years. The win was so unexpected that there was no Latvian flag available for him to fly in celebration. Elerts' medal was considered significant as Latvia would participate in the 1992 Winter Olympics as its own country for the first time since Soviet annexation. Elerts had competed under both the Soviet and Latvian flags, but he preferred to compete under Latvia.
