= Ieva Cederštrēma-Volfa =

Latvian biathlete (born 1969)

Personal information
- Nationality: Latvian
- Born: 13 April 1969 (age 56)

Sport
- Sport: Biathlon

Ieva Cederštrēma-Volfa (born 13 April 1969) is a Latvian biathlete. She competed at the 1994 Winter Olympics and the 1998 Winter Olympics.

Her daughter Estere Volfa is also an Olympic biathlete.
