= Dairis Leksis =

Latvian luger (born 1972)

Personal information
- Nationality: Latvian
- Born: 9 April 1972 (age 53); Valka, Latvia

Sport
- Sport: Luge

Dairis Leksis (born 9 April 1972) is a Latvian luger. He competed at the 1994 Winter Olympics and the 1998 Winter Olympics.
