= Evija Šulce =

Latvian luger

Personal information
- Full name: Evija Šulce-Švāne
- Nationality: Latvian
- Born: 2 September 1970 (age 54); Riga, Latvia

Sport
- Sport: Luge

Evija Šulce (born 2 September 1970) is a Latvian luger. She competed at the 1992 Winter Olympics and the 1994 Winter Olympics. Her husband is Aivis Švāns.
