= Ivars Ciaguns =

Latvian alpine skier (born 1977)

Personal information
- Nationality: Latvian
- Born: 14 March 1977 (age 48); Riga, Latvian SSR, Soviet Union

Sport
- Sport: Alpine skiing

Ivars Ciaguns (born 14 March 1977) is a Latvian alpine skier.

In his early career he competed at the 1994 and 1995 Junior World Championships, finishing lowly.

He competed at the 1998, 2002 and the 2006 Winter Olympics. His best placement was a 25th place in slalom at the 2002 edition. Competing at the 1999, 2001, 2003 and 2005 World Championships, his best placement was a 27th place in slalom at the 1999 edition.

He made his World Cup debut in October 1998 in Sölden. He competed in seven additional races, but never managed to finish a single race, and thus did not collect any World Cup point. His last World Cup outing came in January 2004 in Schladming.
