= Jānis Ozols (bobsleigh) =

Latvian bobsledder

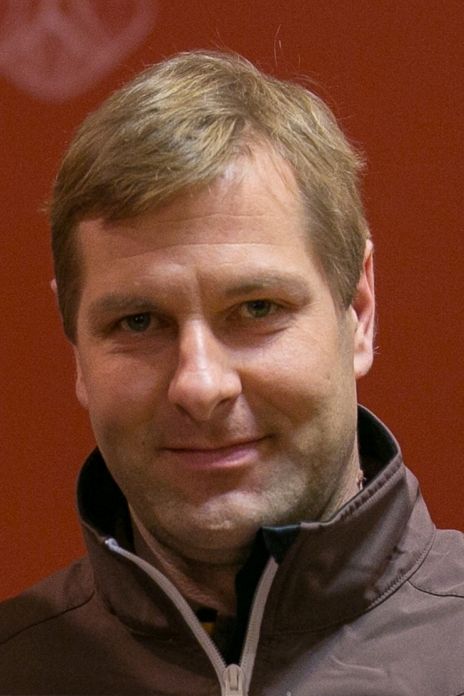
- Jānis Ozols in 2014

Personal information
- Nationality: Latvian
- Born: 4 December 1972 (age 53) Jūrmala, Latvia
- Height: 1.83 m (6 ft 0 in)

Sport
- Sport: Bobsleigh

Jānis Ozols (born 4 December 1972) is a Latvian bobsledder and the physical fitness coach of the Latvian bobsleigh national team. He competed at the 1998, 2002 and the 2006 Winter Olympics.
