= Juris Vovčoks =

Latvian luger (born 1972)

Personal information
- Nationality: Latvian
- Born: 16 January 1972 (age 53); Bauska, Latvia
- Height: 186 cm (6 ft 1 in)
- Weight: 86 kg (190 lb)

Sport
- Sport: Luge

Juris Vovčoks (born 16 January 1972) is a Latvian luger. He competed at the 1994 Winter Olympics and the 1998 Winter Olympics.
