= Guntis Rēķis =

Latvian luger (born 1974)

Personal information
- Born: 3 November 1974 (age 52) Riga, Latvian SSR, Soviet Union
Medal record
Luge
Representing Latvia
World Championships
Bronze medal – third place	2008 Oberhof	Mixed team
Bronze medal – third place	2009 Lake Placid	Mixed team

Guntis Rēķis (born 3 November 1974) is a Latvian luger who has competed since 1997. He won two bronze medals in the mixed team event at the FIL World Luge Championships, earning them in 2008 and 2009.

Competing in three Winter Olympics, Rēķis earned his best finish of 21st in the men's singles event at Turin in 2006.
