= Jānis Hermanis =

Latvian cross-country skier (born 1970)

Personal information
- Born: 18 May 1970 (age 54); Vietalva, Pļaviņu novads, Latvia
- Height: 186 cm (6 ft 1 in)
- Weight: 80 kg (176 lb)

Sport
- Country: Latvia
- Sport: Cross-country skiing

Jānis Hermanis (born 18 May 1970) is a Latvian cross-country skier. He competed at the 1992 Winter Olympics, the 1994 Winter Olympics and the 1998 Winter Olympics.
