= Anžela Brice =

Latvian biathlete (born 1970)

Andžela Brice
Personal information
- Nationality: Latvian
- Born: 21 March 1970 (age 55)

Sport
- Sport: Biathlon

Anžela Brice (born 21 March 1970) is a Latvian biathlete. She competed at the 2002 Winter Olympics and the 2006 Winter Olympics. She also competed in the cross-country skiing at the 1998 Winter Olympics.
