= Cēsis =

Town and municipal centre in Vidzeme, Latvia

- Town
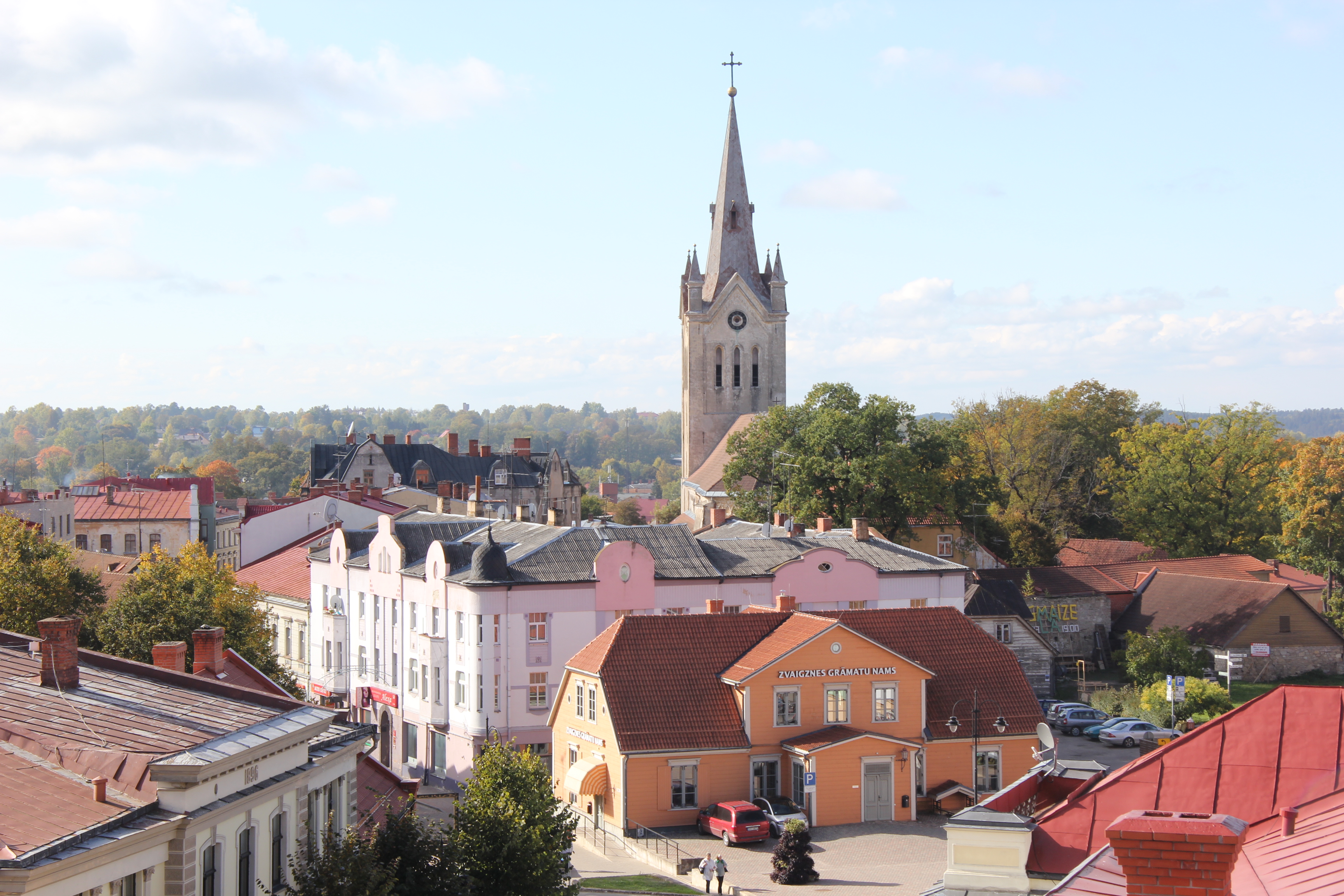
- Cēsis skyline

- Flag Coat of arms

- Location in Latvia
- Coordinates: 57°19′N 25°16′E
- Country: Latvia
- Municipality: Cēsis Municipality
- First mentioned: 1206
- First recorded as a town: 1323

Government
  - Mayor: Jānis Rozenbergs

Area
  - Total: 19.27 km^{2} (7.44 sq mi)
  - Land: 18.67 km^{2} (7.21 sq mi)
  - Water: 0.60 km^{2} (0.23 sq mi)

Population (2026)
  - Total: 14,899
  - Density: 798.0/km^{2} (2,067/sq mi)
- Time zone: UTC+2 (EET)
  - Summer (DST): UTC+3 (EEST)
- Postal codes: LV-4101 to LV-4103
- Website: www.cesis.lv

Cēsis (Latvian pronunciation: [tseːsis]; German: Wenden, Livonian: Venden, Estonian: Võnnu, Polish: Kieś) is a town in the Vidzeme region of Latvia and the administrative centre of Cēsis Municipality. It lies in the northern part of the Vidzeme Upland, about 90 km (56 mi) north-east of Riga, on ridges above the valley of the Gauja. At the beginning of 2026, the town had 14,899 residents.

Cēsis developed around a fortified settlement of the Vends at Riekstu Hill and the nearby medieval castle of the Livonian Brothers of the Sword and later the Livonian Order. The area is first recorded in connection with events of 1206. Cēsis was documented as a town in 1323 and joined the Hanseatic League in the early 15th century.

The historic centre retains its medieval street plan, sections of the town wall, St. John's Church and the ruins of Cēsis Castle. The town is also a regional cultural centre, with Cēsis Concert Hall, the Cēsis Art Festival and the annual LAMPA Conversation Festival.

== History ==
=== Origins and medieval town ===
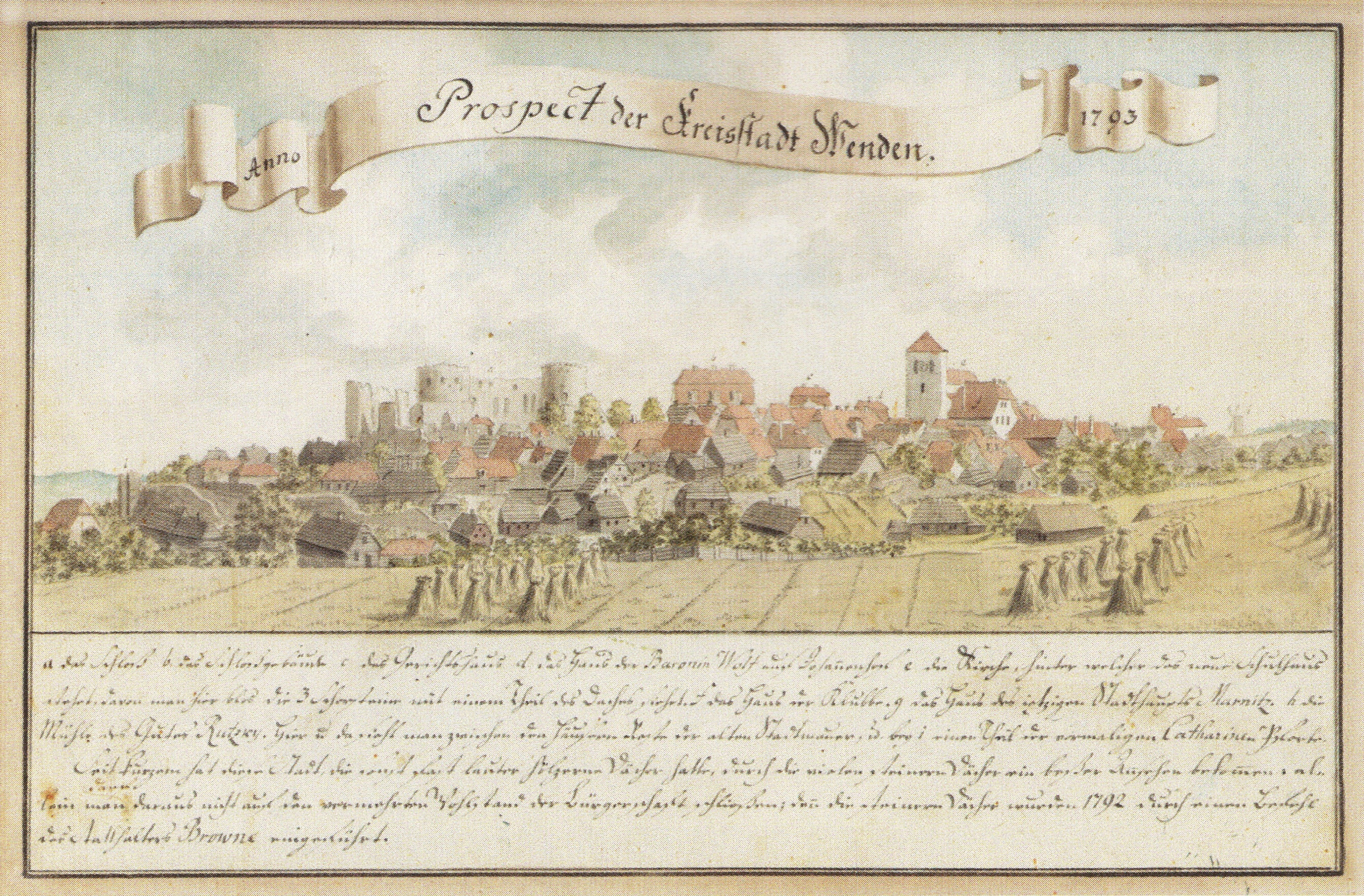
View of Cēsis in 1793

The earliest known fortified settlement was on Riekstu Hill in the present Castle Park, where the Vends lived during the 11th and 12th centuries. After the area came under the control of the Livonian Brothers of the Sword in 1207, construction of a stone castle began on the neighbouring plateau, probably around 1214; the castle is documented in the Chronicle of Henry of Livonia by 1218.

The Chronicle of Henry describes events in the area in 1206, a date conventionally used as the beginning of Cēsis's recorded history. Cēsis was first identified as a town in a document of 1323. It had a town council and burgomasters, and became a member of the Hanseatic League in the early 15th century. The castle was one of the principal political, military and administrative centres of the Livonian Order. After the destruction of the order's castle in Riga in 1484, Cēsis became the main residence of the order's masters and a centre for chapters, diplomatic meetings and assemblies of Livonian towns.

The Livonian Rhymed Chronicle describes a red banner with a white stripe carried by troops from Cēsis in 1279. In Latvia, this account is regarded as the literary prototype of the national red-white-red flag.

=== Early modern period ===
Lutheran preaching began in Cēsis in 1524. The town and castle were heavily damaged during the Livonian War. During the siege of 1577, several hundred people sheltering in the castle killed themselves by igniting gunpowder rather than surrendering to the army of Ivan the Terrible. The castle never regained its earlier military and political importance.

After the Livonian War, Cēsis came under the Polish-Lithuanian Commonwealth and became the centre of a Catholic bishopric. Swedish forces completed their conquest of the town in 1626. Cēsis suffered repeated fires in the 17th century, and Russian troops occupied it in 1703 during the Great Northern War. Together with the rest of Vidzeme, it became part of the Russian Empire after the war. Cēsis became a district town in 1785.

A road connection to the Riga-Pskov highway was completed in 1868, and the Riga-Pskov railway opened through Cēsis in 1889. These links accelerated urban growth and the development of brewing, metalworking, printing and other industries.

=== 20th century ===
During the First World War, Cēsis was a front-line town, a base for the Russian 12th Army and an important centre for refugees. After Latvia declared independence in November 1918, the Cēsis Company (Latvian: Cēsu rota), an early unit of the provisional government's armed forces, was formed in the town. The Battles of Cēsis in June 1919 ended in an Estonian and Latvian victory over German forces and marked a major turning point in the Latvian War of Independence.

During the interwar republic, Cēsis developed as a regional administrative, educational, industrial and health-care centre. Soviet occupation changed the system of local government and the town's demographic structure. During the national revival, Latvia's first local branch of the Popular Front of Latvia was founded in Cēsis on 11 September 1988. On 22 October 1988, the red-white-red flag was raised above the New Castle, making Cēsis the first town in the country to restore the flag over a major public building during the revival period.

== Geography and demographics ==
Cēsis occupies about 19.3 km^{2} (7.5 sq mi) in the northern Vidzeme Upland. The Gauja flows for approximately 5 km (3.1 mi) along the town's territory. The highest point within the town is Zvirbuļkalns, at 113 m (371 ft) above sea level.

The Central Statistical Bureau recorded 14,899 residents at the beginning of 2026. Historically, Cēsis had a substantial Baltic German community. Latvians formed a majority by the 1897 census, and in 1925 they accounted for about 90 per cent of the population. The town's ethnic composition changed again during the Soviet period as migration from other parts of the Soviet Union increased.

=== Climate ===
Cēsis has a humid continental climate (Köppen Dfb). The climate table below uses observations from Zosēni station.

Climate data for Zosēni station, Cēsis Municipality (1991-2020 normals, extremes 1945-present)
| Month | Jan | Feb | Mar | Apr | May | Jun | Jul | Aug | Sep | Oct | Nov | Dec | Year |
|---|---|---|---|---|---|---|---|---|---|---|---|---|---|
| Record high °C (°F) | 8.7 (47.7) | 10.6 (51.1) | 18.5 (65.3) | 26.8 (80.2) | 29.1 (84.4) | 31.3 (88.3) | 34.1 (93.4) | 33.6 (92.5) | 28.8 (83.8) | 21.2 (70.2) | 14.5 (58.1) | 10.6 (51.1) | 34.1 (93.4) |
| Mean daily maximum °C (°F) | −2.3 (27.9) | −1.8 (28.8) | 2.9 (37.2) | 10.7 (51.3) | 16.7 (62.1) | 20.2 (68.4) | 22.6 (72.7) | 21.3 (70.3) | 15.7 (60.3) | 8.8 (47.8) | 2.8 (37.0) | −0.7 (30.7) | 9.7 (49.5) |
| Daily mean °C (°F) | −4.5 (23.9) | −4.7 (23.5) | −1.0 (30.2) | 5.5 (41.9) | 10.9 (51.6) | 14.6 (58.3) | 17.0 (62.6) | 15.8 (60.4) | 11.0 (51.8) | 5.4 (41.7) | 0.8 (33.4) | −2.6 (27.3) | 5.7 (42.2) |
| Mean daily minimum °C (°F) | −7.4 (18.7) | −8.2 (17.2) | −5.1 (22.8) | 0.1 (32.2) | 4.1 (39.4) | 8.6 (47.5) | 11.2 (52.2) | 10.3 (50.5) | 6.6 (43.9) | 2.3 (36.1) | −1.5 (29.3) | −4.9 (23.2) | 1.3 (34.4) |
| Record low °C (°F) | −40.6 (−41.1) | −42.2 (−44.0) | −30.5 (−22.9) | −21.8 (−7.2) | −10.5 (13.1) | −2.0 (28.4) | 1.1 (34.0) | −1.7 (28.9) | −7.3 (18.9) | −16.3 (2.7) | −24.6 (−12.3) | −42.9 (−45.2) | −42.9 (−45.2) |
| Average precipitation mm (inches) | 57.4 (2.26) | 43.8 (1.72) | 40.8 (1.61) | 41.7 (1.64) | 58.1 (2.29) | 80.7 (3.18) | 79.8 (3.14) | 75.9 (2.99) | 57.5 (2.26) | 78.6 (3.09) | 58.9 (2.32) | 56.2 (2.21) | 729.4 (28.71) |
| Average precipitation days (≥ 1.0 mm) | 13 | 11 | 10 | 8 | 9 | 11 | 10 | 11 | 10 | 12 | 12 | 13 | 130 |
| Average relative humidity (%) | 89.1 | 86.6 | 78.0 | 69.9 | 68.9 | 74.0 | 76.5 | 79.3 | 83.7 | 87.4 | 91.0 | 90.9 | 81.3 |
| Mean monthly sunshine hours | 27.3 | 58.4 | 130.3 | 190.3 | 261.1 | 249.4 | 265.6 | 235.9 | 149.1 | 79.8 | 27.9 | 18.6 | 1,693.7 |
Source 1: LVĢMC
Source 2: NOAA (humidity and precipitation days, 1991-2020)

== Architecture and heritage ==
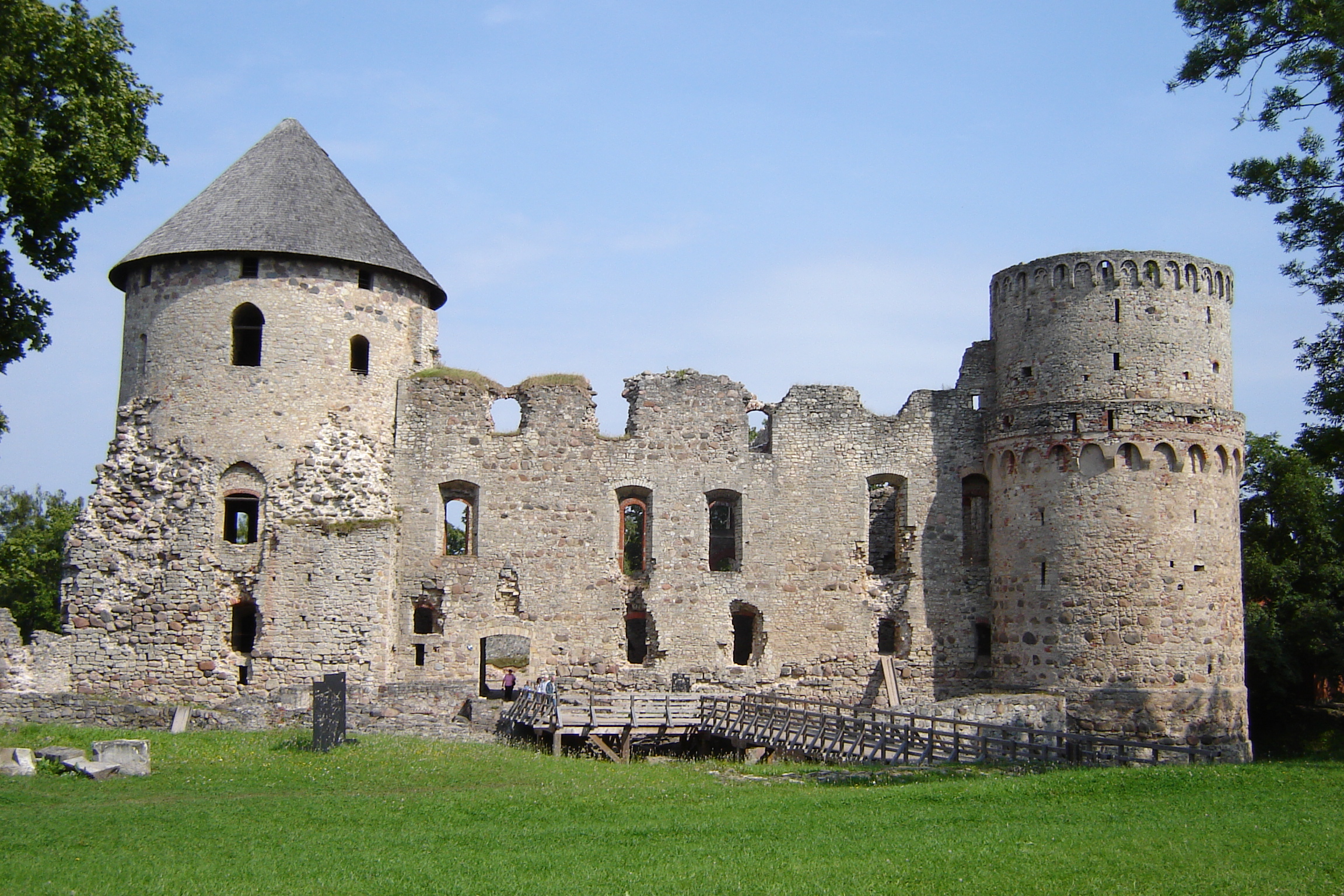
Ruins of Cēsis Castle

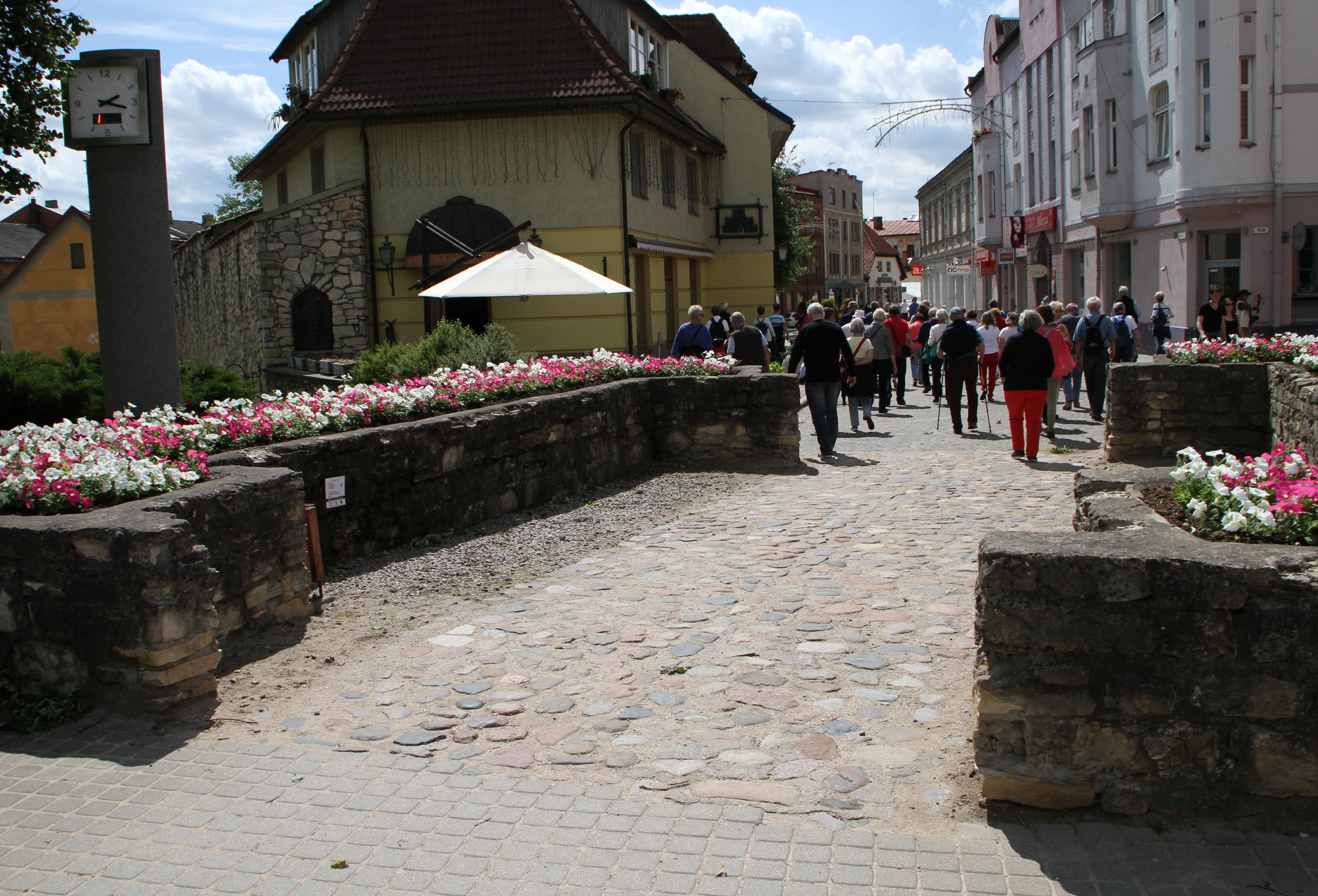
A reconstruction marking the medieval Rauna Gate

The historic centre occupies about 27 ha (67 acres). Archaeological evidence shows that parts of the old town were inhabited before the medieval urban settlement developed, and the cultural layer reaches up to 3.8 m (12 ft) in places. The surviving townscape retains the medieval street network and fragments of the fortification walls, while later buildings reflect reconstruction after wars and fires.

Cēsis Castle was begun around 1214 and served for more than three centuries as a major centre of the Livonian Order. Its ruins are a state-protected architectural and archaeological monument. Archaeological excavations conducted over more than 30 seasons between 1974 and 2008 investigated almost 10,000 m^{2} (110,000 sq ft) of the castle complex.

The adjacent New Castle developed from a 16th-century fortification building and was converted into the manor residence in 1762. Since 1949 it has housed the town's history museum. The Cēsis Museum was founded in 1925 and holds more than 170,000 objects relating to the history of the town, the municipality and Vidzeme, including collections on the Latvian flag, the Cēsis battles and the castle complex.

Other prominent landmarks include St. John's Church, built in the late 13th century; the reconstructed location of the medieval Rauna Gate; and the Victory Monument in Unity Square, which commemorates the Latvian and Estonian victory in the 1919 battles.

== Culture and education ==
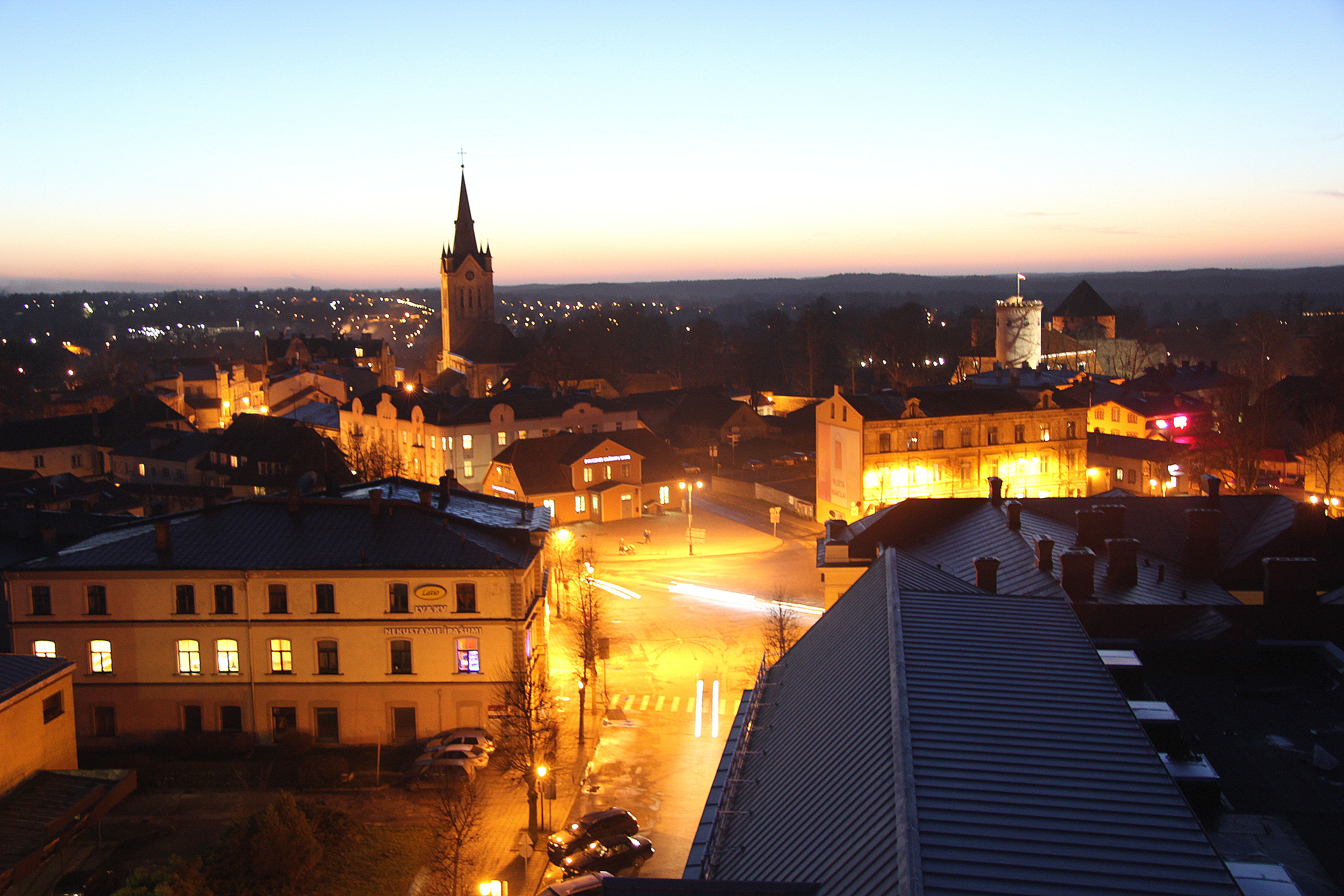
Cēsis at night, viewed from the concert hall

Cēsis Concert Hall opened in 2014 in a reconstructed community building dating from 1915. It contains a large auditorium, chamber and organ halls, a cinema and exhibition spaces, and also accommodates the Alfrēds Kalniņš Cēsis Music Secondary School.

The Cēsis Art Festival began in 2007 as a multidisciplinary summer programme combining visual art, music, opera, theatre and film. The LAMPA Conversation Festival has been held in Castle Park since 2015 and brings together civil-society groups, public institutions, media, political organisations and other participants for public discussions and cultural events.

Cēsis competed for the Latvian nomination for European Capital of Culture in both the 2014 and 2027 cycles; Riga and Liepāja were selected respectively. The work prepared for the 2027 bid was subsequently used for a year-long programme under the title Latvian Capital of Culture 2025.

The town's educational institutions include Cēsis State Gymnasium, Draudzīgā Aicinājuma Cēsis State Gymnasium, the Alfrēds Kalniņš Cēsis Music Secondary School and the Vidzeme Technology and Design Vocational School. Riga Technical University and the University of Latvia operate study centres or branches in Cēsis. The Space Education Centre, opened in 2023, provides programmes intended to promote science, technology, engineering and mathematics education.

== Economy and transport ==
The railway and road connections built in the 19th century transformed Cēsis into a regional industrial and commercial centre. Brewing, food production, metalworking, printing and building-material production were among the important historical industries. In the contemporary economy, services, trade, food production, transport and logistics, forestry-related activity, and the cultural and creative industries are significant sectors. Cēsu Alus is one of the town's longstanding industrial enterprises.

Cēsis is connected to the national road network by regional roads leading towards Riga, Valmiera, Limbaži and Madona. The A2 is about 9 km (5.6 mi) from the town and the A3 about 16 km (9.9 mi) away. Cēsis station is on the Riga-Valga railway line, and regional bus services are operated by CATA.

== Notable people ==
- - & Cēsis Municipality#Notable people
- Alfrēds Kalniņš (1879-1951), a composer, organist, music critic and conductor; founded the Latvian National Opera
- Johannes Letzmann (1885–1971), an Estonian meteorologist and a pioneering tornado researcher.
- Karlis Johansons (1890–1929), a Latvian-Soviet avant-garde artist.
- Max Hildebert Boehm, (DE Wiki) (1891-1968), a German politician, sociologist and publicist.
- Eduard Erdmann (1896-1958), a Baltic German pianist and composer
- Nina Vatatsy (1908-1997), a Belarusian bibliographer and literary critic
- Laima Vaikule (born 1954), actress, singer, director and choreographer

=== Sport ===
- Edvīns Ķeņģis (born 1959), chess Grandmaster
- Ingrīda Amantova (born 1960), luger, bronze medallist in the women's singles at the 1980 Winter Olympics
- Iluta Gaile (born 1968), businesswoman, politician and former luger, who competed at four Winter Olympic Games
- Artis Rasmanis (born 1971), politician and retired Latvian sidecarcross passenger and five times World Champion.
- Kristers Serģis (born 1974), sidecarcross rider and five-time World Champion.
- Bohdan Smishko (born 1978), a Ukrainian former footballer who played over 300 games
- Agris Lasmans (born 1979), wheelchair curler, team bronze winner at the 2026 Winter Paralympics
- Roman Smishko (born 1983), a retired Ukrainian football goalkeeper, he played over 250 games.
- Baiba Bendika (born 1991), biathlete and cross-country skier, competed at the 2022 Winter Olympics
- Rodions Kurucs (born 1998) & Artūrs Kurucs (born 2000), basketball players

== International relations ==
Cēsis Municipality lists continuing cooperation with six partner cities:

- Achim, Germany
- Alytus, Lithuania
- Rakvere, Estonia
- Rokiškis, Lithuania
- Suwałki, Poland
- Tyresö, Sweden
