= Ilonda Lūse =

Latvian speed skater

Personal information
- Nationality: Latvian
- Born: 11 July 1972 (age 53); Riga, Soviet Union
- Height: 181 cm (5 ft 11 in)
- Weight: 72 kg (159 lb)

Sport
- Sport: Speed skating

Ilonda Lūse (born 11 July 1972) is a Latvian speed skater. She competed at the 1994, 1998 and the 2002 Winter Olympics.

== Biography ==
=== Early life and education ===
Lūse was born 11 July 1972, in Riga, (Soviet Union). She completed her studies at Riga Technical University (RTU) and is currently pursuing further education at the Latvian Academy of Sport Education (LSPA).

At age 22, Lūse competed in the 1994 Winter Olympics in Lillehammer, Norway. She was the first Latvian skater to participate in international competition after Latvia became independent in 1991.

== Achievements ==
- Finished in 26th position in 1995, 26th place in 1996, and 30th place in 1997 at the world championships in all-around.
- Start in sprint all-around at the World Championship: 1998; 32nd place.
- In the all-around division, she started the European Championships in 1994 in 22nd position, 1995 in 20th place, 1996 in 24th place, 1997 in 24th place, 1999 in 21st place, and 2000 in 18th place.

=== Olympic achievement ===
- In Lillehammer, Norway, 1994 XVII, she took 25th place in the 3000 m speed skating competition.
- In Nagano, Japan, 1998 XVIII; Skating 39th place in the 1000m speed skating event, Skating Speed skating 32nd place in 1500m, and Skating 28th position in 3000m speed skating.
- In Salt Lake City, US, 2002 XIX she took 35th place in 1500m speed skating and 30th place in the 3000m speed skating competition.
