= Gundars Upenieks =

Latvian biathlete (born 1971)

Personal information
- Nationality: Latvian
- Born: 31 March 1971 (age 54); Madona, Latvia

Sport
- Sport: Biathlon

Gundars Upenieks (born 31 March 1971) is a Latvian biathlete. He competed at the 1992, 1994, 1998 and the 2002 Winter Olympics. From 2002 until 2006, Upenieks was the secretary general of the Latvian Biathlon federation. Since 2013, he is a vice president of Latvian Biathlon federation.
