= Iluta Gaile =

Latvian politician

- Born: 10 December 1968 (age 57); Cēsis, Latvia SSR
- Years active: 1988 – 2002 (luger); 2002 – (businesswomen)
- Known for: Luger; Businesswomen and politician
- Political party: People's Party
- Sports career
- Country: Latvia
- Sport: Luge
- Retired: 2002

Sports achievements and titles
- Olympic finals: 1992, 1994, 1998, 2002
- Regional finals: 1988, 1989, 1990 (USSR)
- National finals: 1988, 1994, 1998, 2000
Medal record
Luge
USSR National Championship
Bronze medal – third place	1988	Luge
Bronze medal – third place	1989	Luge
Silver medal – second place	1990	Luge
Latvia SSR National Championship
Gold medal – first place	1988	Luge
Latvian National Championship
Gold medal – first place	1994	Luge
Gold medal – first place	1998	Luge
Gold medal – first place	2000	Luge

Iluta Gaile (born 10 December 1968) is a Latvian businesswoman, politician and former luger, who competed at four Winter Olympic Games. She is a former deputy for Riga City Council.

== Personal life ==
Gaile was born in Cēsis, Latvia SSR (now Latvia), and grew up in Stalbe. As of 2017, Gaile lived in Sigulda. As a teenager, Gaile trained on the Cēsis track.

== Sporting career ==
Gaile competed in the luge event at four Winter Olympic Games. She finished 10th in 1992, 17th in 1994, 14th in 1998, and 10th in 2002.

In 1988 and 1989, she came third in the USSR national championships, and in 1990, she came second in the event. In 1988, she won the Latvia SSR national championships, and in 1994, 1998, and 2000, she won the Latvian national championships. She was part of the Latvian team that won the 1991 Luge World Cup event in Germany. Her best individual result at the FIL World Luge Championships was 8th in 2001.

== Political career ==
After retiring from luge, Gaile undertook a master's degree in entrepreneurship. She later set up a recruitment company, IG Konsultācijas. In 2005, she stood for the People's Party as a deputy for Riga City Council. She was not initially selected, but was given the seat after Jānis Freimanis died in 2006.
