= Sandis Prūsis =

Latvian bobsledder

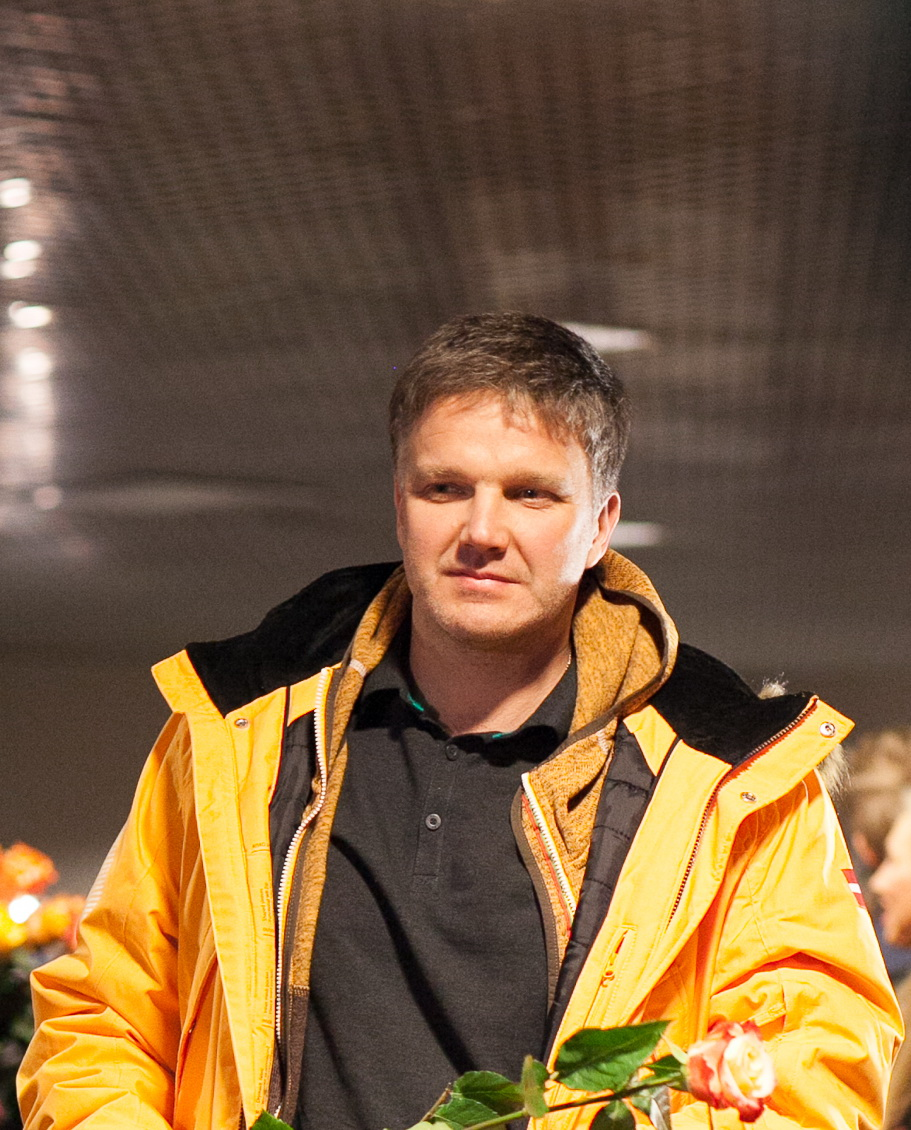
- Sandis Prūsis in 2014

Medal record

Men's Bobsleigh

Representing Latvia

World Cups
Silver medal – second place	2000-01	Four-man
Silver medal – second place	2002-03	Four-man
Bronze medal – third place	1998-99	Two-man
Bronze medal – third place	1997-98	Combined
Bronze medal – third place	2000-01	Combined

European Championships
Gold medal – first place	2000-01	Four-man
Gold medal – first place	2003-04	Four-man

Sandis Prūsis (born 24 October 1965 in Ventspils) is a Latvian bobsleigh coach and former bobsledder. Starting his career in the 1980s, he competed professionally from 1990 to 2003. Competing in three Winter Olympics, he earned his best finish in the two-man event at Nagano in 1998, he got fifth place. Prūsis's best Bobsleigh World Cup finish was second two times, all in the four-man event (2000-1, 2002-3).

== Professional career ==
Sandis Prūsis started to compete in the 1980s. In his first Winter Olympic Games in 1992 he was originally a reservist, but took part in the games due to Jānis Ķipurs' injury, delivering a surprise by managing to overtake the team of his compatriot Zintis Ekmanis. In 1998 he was 5th in two-man competition and 6th in four-man competition in the Winter Olympic Games at Nagano. In 1998 he came 3rd in the World Cup in two-man competition and combined competition. In the World Cups of 2000 and in 2003 Sandis Prūsis won the silver medal in four-man competition in general classification. In 2001 he won silver in four-man and bronze in combined competition at the World Cup. He became the four-man European champion in 2000 and 2003 (along with brakemen Mārcis Rullis, Jānis Silarājs, and Jānis Ozols).

Prūsis has been a six-time-winner of the Latvian Bobsleigh Championship (1993, 1995, 1998 to 2001), champion of the Latvian SSR (1990), gold medalist at the 2000 Winter Goodwill Games and carried the flag of Latvia at the 1998 Winter Olympics. Sandis Prūsis finished his career after the 2002/2003 World Cup season in bobsleigh. After ending his bobsleigh career, Prūsis coached the Italian bobsleigh team from 2004 to 2006. From 2006 to 2025, he was the head coach for the Latvian team.
