= Oļegs Maļuhins =

Latvian biathlete (born 1969)

Personal information
- Full name: Oļegs Maļuhins
- Born: 6 May 1969 (age 57) Daugavpils, Latvian SSR, Soviet Union
- Height: 1.83 m (6 ft 0 in)

Sport

Professional information
- Sport: Biathlon; Cross-country skiing

Olympic Games
- Teams: 4 (1992, 1994, 1998, 2002); 1 (2006)
- Medals: 0

World Championships
- Teams: 11 (1992, 1993, 1995, 1996, 1997, 1998, 1999, 2000, 2001, 2003, 2004); 1 (2009)
- Medals: 0

World Cup
- Seasons: 15 (1991/92–2003/04, 2005/06, 2009/10)
- Individual victories: 1
- Individual podiums: 2

Oļegs Maļuhins (рус. Олег Малюхин, born 6 May 1969) is a former Latvian biathlete.

== Career ==
Maļuhins was not made part of the Latvian Olympic biathlon team in 2006, and so participated in cross-country skiing instead. He retired after that season, but announced a comeback in 2008 stating that he would try to qualify for the 2010 Winter Olympics. He did not qualify. Altogether, he participated in five Olympic Games.

Currently, he works as a coach near Daugavpils.

== Biathlon results ==
All results are sourced from the International Biathlon Union.

=== Olympic Games ===
| Event | Individual | Sprint | Pursuit | Relay |
|---|---|---|---|---|
| (France) 1992 Albertville | 69th | 13th | —N/a | 16th |
| (Norway) 1994 Lillehammer | 40th | — | —N/a | 16th |
| (Japan) 1998 Nagano | — | 6th | —N/a | 6th |
| (United States) 2002 Salt Lake City | DNF | 46th | 30th | 17th |

*Pursuit was added as an event in 2002.

=== World Championships ===
| Event | Individual | Sprint | Pursuit | Mass start | Team | Relay |
|---|---|---|---|---|---|---|
| (Russia) 1992 Novosibirsk | —N/a | —N/a | —N/a | —N/a | 10th | —N/a |
| (Bulgaria) 1993 Borovets | 41st | 41st | —N/a | —N/a | 19th | 18th |
| (Italy) 1995 Antholz-Anterselva | 67th | — | —N/a | —N/a | 7th | 12th |
| (Germany) 1996 Ruhpolding | 20th | 48th | —N/a | —N/a | 13th | 11th |
| (Slovakia) 1997 Brezno-Osrblie | 33rd | 64th | — | —N/a | 12th | 12th |
| (Slovenia) 1998 Pokljuka | —N/a | —N/a | 11th | —N/a | — | —N/a |
| (Finland) 1999 Kontiolahti | 28th | 5th | 4th | 7th | —N/a | 5th |
| (Norway) 2000 Oslo Holmenkollen | 15th | 15th | 7th | 7th | —N/a | 6th |
| (Slovenia) 2001 Pokljuka | 30th | 21st | 19th | 17th | —N/a | 9th |
| (Russia) 2003 Khanty-Mansiysk | 15th | 26th | 35th | — | —N/a | 12th |
| (Germany) 2004 Oberhof | 42nd | 30th | 43rd | — | —N/a | 13th |

*During Olympic seasons competitions are only held for those events not included in the Olympic program.
**Team was removed as an event in 1998, and pursuit was added in 1997 with mass start being added in 1999.

=== Individual victories ===
1 victory (1 Sp)

| Season | Date | Location | Discipline | Level |
|---|---|---|---|---|
| 1998–99; 1 victory (1 Sp) | 4 March 1999 | (Canada) Valcartier | 10 km sprint | Biathlon World Cup |

*Results are from UIPMB and IBU races which include the Biathlon World Cup, Biathlon World Championships and the Winter Olympic Games.
