= Roberts Suharevs =

Latvian luger (born 1970)

Personal information
- Nationality: Latvian
- Born: 27 January 1970 (age 55); Sigulda, Latvia

Sport
- Sport: Luge

Roberts Suharevs (born 27 January 1970) is a Latvian luger. He competed at the 1992 Winter Olympics, the 1994 Winter Olympics and the 1998 Winter Olympics.
