= Russia at the 2002 Winter Olympics =

- IOC code: RUS
- NOC: Russian Olympic Committee
- Website: www.roc.ru (in Russian)

in Salt Lake City
- Competitors: 151 in 15 sports
- Flag bearer: Alexey Prokurorov
- Medals Ranked 5th: Gold 5 Silver 4 Bronze 4 Total 13

Winter Olympics appearances (overview)
- 1994; 1998; 2002; 2006; 2010; 2014; 2018–2026

Other related appearances
- Soviet Union (1956–1988); Unified Team (1992); Olympic Athletes from Russia (2018); ROC (2022); Individual Neutral Athletes (2026)

Russia competed at the 2002 Winter Olympics in Salt Lake City.

== Medalists ==
Medal	Name	Sport	Event
Gold	Olga Pyleva	Biathlon	Women's 10 km pursuit
Gold	Mikhail Ivanov	Cross-country skiing	Men's 50 km classical
Gold	Yuliya Chepalova	Cross-country skiing	Women's 1.5 km sprint
Gold	Alexei Yagudin	Figure skating	Men's
Gold	Elena Berezhnaya, Anton Sikharulidze	Figure skating	Pairs
Silver	Yuliya Chepalova	Cross-country skiing	Women's 10 km classical
Silver	Evgeni Plushenko	Figure skating	Men's
Silver	Irina Slutskaya	Figure skating	Ladies'
Silver	Irina Lobacheva, Ilia Averbukh	Figure skating	Ice dance
Bronze	Viktor Maigourov	Biathlon	Men's 20 km individual
Bronze	Albina Akhatova, Svetlana Ishmouratova; Galina Koukleva, Olga Pyleva	Biathlon	Women's 4 x 7.5 km Relay
Bronze	Yuliya Chepalova	Cross-country skiing	Women's 15 km freestyle mass start
Bronze	Maxim Afinogenov, Ilya Bryzgalov; Pavel Bure, Valeri Bure; Pavel Datsyuk, Sergei Fedorov; Sergei Gonchar, Darius Kasparaitis; Nikolai Khabibulin, Ilya Kovalchuk; Alexei Kovalev, Igor Kravchuk; Oleg Kvasha, Igor Larionov; Vladimir Malakhov, Daniil Markov; Andrei Nikolishin, Yegor Podomatsky; Sergei Samsonov, Alexei Yashin; Alexei Zhamnov	Ice hockey	Men's team

== Alpine skiing ==
Men

Athlete	Event	Final				
Athlete	Event	Run 1	Run 2	Run 3	Total	Rank
Andrey Filichkin	Downhill				1:43.73	41
Andrey Filichkin	Giant Slalom	1:15.74	Did Not Finish		Did Not Finish	
Andrey Filichkin	Super-G				Did Not Finish	
Andrey Filichkin	Combined	1:43.04	50.19	54.91	3:28.14	14
Maksim Kedrin	Downhill				1:43.04	36
Maksim Kedrin	Combined	1:42.81	Did Not Start		Did Not Finish	
Sergey Komarov	Downhill				1:45.25	44
Sergey Komarov	Giant Slalom	1:17.78	1:15.78		2:33.56	40
Sergey Komarov	Super-G				Did Not Finish	
Sergey Komarov	Combined	1:43.47	51.66	56.90	3:32.03	22
Pavel Shestakov	Downhill				1:44.35	43
Pavel Shestakov	Giant Slalom	1:15.80	1:14.17		2:29.97	32
Pavel Shestakov	Super-G				1:25.16	23
Pavel Shestakov	Combined	1:41.45	52.54	56.19	3:30.18	18

Women

Athlete	Event	Final				
Athlete	Event	Run 1	Run 2	Run 3	Total	Rank
Varvara Zelenskaya	Downhill				1:42.43	21
Varvara Zelenskaya	Super-G				1:16.62	26

== Biathlon ==
Men

Athlete	Event	Final		
Athlete	Event	Time	Misses	Rank
Viktor Maigourov	20 km Individual	51:40.6	1	3rd place, bronze medalist(s)
Viktor Maigourov	10 km Sprint	25:50.9	0	7
Viktor Maigourov	12.5 km Pursuit	33:55.1	3	7
Pavel Rostovtsev	20 km Individual	52:33.5	1	6
Pavel Rostovtsev	10 km Sprint	25:50.1	1	6
Pavel Rostovtsev	12.5 km Pursuit	33:43.1	2	5
Sergei Rozhkov	20 km Individual	53:43.8	0	12
Sergei Rozhkov	10 km Sprint	27:39.8	4	51
Sergei Rozhkov	12.5 km Pursuit	35:37.1	1	27
Sergei Rusinov	10 km Sprint	27:04.3	1	33
Sergei Rusinov	12.5 km Pursuit	36:14.5	3	31
Sergei Tchepikov	20 km Individual	52:44.2	1	8
Viktor Maigourov; Sergei Rozhkov; Sergei Tchepikov; Pavel Rostovtsev	4 x 7.5 km Relay	1:24:54.4	9	4

Women

Athlete	Event	Final		
Athlete	Event	Time	Misses	Rank
Albina Akhatova	15 km Individual	49:06.1	2	10
Anna Bogaliy	7.5 km Sprint	22:25.8	2	18
Anna Bogaliy	10 km Pursuit	33:30.0	3	19
Svetlana Ishmouratova	15 km Individual	48:45.0	2	8
Svetlana Ishmouratova	7.5 km Sprint	22:27.3	2	19
Svetlana Ishmouratova	10 km Pursuit	32:50.3	3	15
Galina Koukleva	7.5 km Sprint	21:32.1	0	6
Galina Koukleva	10 km Pursuit	31:31.7	3	5
Olga Pyleva	15 km Individual	48:14.0	2	4
Olga Pyleva	7.5 km Sprint	21:44.2	1	8
Olga Pyleva	10 km Pursuit	31:07.7	1	1st place, gold medalist(s)
Olga Zaitseva	15 km Individual	52:26.2	4	37
Olga Pyleva; Galina Koukleva; Svetlana Ishmouratova; Albina Akhatova	4 x 7.5 km Relay	1:29:19.7	15	3rd place, bronze medalist(s)

== Bobsleigh ==
Athlete	Event	Final					
Athlete	Event	Run 1	Run 2	Run 3	Run 4	Total	Rank
Yevgeni Popov; Pyotr Makarchuk	Two-man	48.12	48.18	48.22	48.19	3:12.71	15
Alexandr Zubkov; Dmitriy Stepushkin	Two-man	48.71	48.16	48.15	48.07	3:13.09	18
Viktoria Tokovaya; Kristina Bader	Two-woman	49.72	49.55			1:39.2	8
Yevgeni Popov; Pyotr Makarchuk; Sergey Golubev; Dmitriy Stepushkin	Four-man	47.14	46.98	47.45	47.58	3:09.15	8
Alexandr Zubkov; Alexei Seliverstov; Filipp Yegorov; Alexey Andryunin	Four-man	47.26	47.09	47.76	48.04	3:10.15	16

== Cross-country skiing ==
Distance

Men

Athlete	Event	Final	
Athlete	Event	Total	Rank
Nikolay Bolshakov	30 km freestyle mass start	1:12:50.6	7
Vitaly Denisov	15 km classical	38:17.9	7
Vitaly Denisov	20 km (10 km + 10 km) pursuit	49:58.5	5
Mikhail Ivanov	15 km classical	38:51.3	11
Mikhail Ivanov	50 km classical	2:06:20.8	1st place, gold medalist(s)
Sergey Kriyanin	30 km freestyle mass start	1:12:52.0	8
Sergey Kriyanin	50 km classical	2:16:59.8	24
Sergei Novikov	15 km classical	38:49.3	10
Sergei Novikov	20 km (10 km + 10 km) pursuit	50:45.9	16
Alexey Prokurorov	20 km (10 km + 10 km) pursuit	51:25.2	28
Alexey Prokurorov	50 km classical	2:18:30.4	29
Vasily Rochev	15 km classical	39:42.1	25
Dmitri Tishkin	30 km freestyle mass start	1:15:10.2	30
Vladimir Vilisov	30 km freestyle mass start	1:13:54.1	16
Vladimir Vilisov	20 km (10 km + 10 km) pursuit	51:45.4	36
Vladimir Vilisov	50 km classical	2:14:37.5	15
Sergei Novikov; Mikhail Ivanov; Vitaly Denisov; Nikolay Bolshakov	4 × 10 km relay	1:34:50.1	6

Women

Athlete	Event	Final	
Athlete	Event	Total	Rank
Yelena Burukhina	15 km freestyle mass start	41:01.1	13
Yuliya Chepalova	15 km freestyle mass start	40:02.7	3rd place, bronze medalist(s)
Yuliya Chepalova	10 km classical	28:09.9	2nd place, silver medalist(s)
Yuliya Chepalova	10 km (5 km + 5 km) pursuit	25:11.3	4
Yuliya Chepalova	30 km classical	1:35:37.4	9
Olga Danilova	10 km classical	Disqualified	
Olga Danilova	10 km (5 km + 5 km) pursuit	Disqualified	
Olga Danilova	30 km classical	Disqualified	
Nina Gavrilyuk	10 km (5 km + 5 km) pursuit	25:13.5	5
Larisa Lazutina	15 km freestyle mass start	Disqualified	
Larisa Lazutina	10 km classical	Disqualified	
Larisa Lazutina	10 km (5 km + 5 km) pursuit	Disqualified	
Larisa Lazutina	30 km classical	Disqualified	
Olga Zavyalova	15 km freestyle mass start	40:53.3	11
Olga Zavyalova	30 km classical	1:37:47.4	19
Lyubov Yegorova	10 km classical	28:50.7	5

Sprint

Athlete	Event	Qualifying		Quarterfinal		Semifinal		Final	
Athlete	Event	Total	Rank	Total	Rank	Total	Rank	Total	Rank
Yelena Burukhina	Women's 1.5 km sprint	3:17.26	12 Q	3:19.3	4	Did not advance			16
Yuliya Chepalova	Women's 1.5 km sprint	3:13.03	2 Q	3:14.9	2 Q	3:18.2	1 Q	3:10.6	1st place, gold medalist(s)
Vitaly Denisov	Men's 1.5 km sprint	2:59.21	31	Did not advance					30
Nina Gavrilyuk	Women's 1.5 km sprint	3:20.02	20	Did not advance					20
Sergei Novikov	Men's 1.5 km sprint	2:54.35	17	Did not advance					16
Vasily Rochev	Men's 1.5 km sprint	2:57.76	29	Did not advance					28
Dmitri Tishkin	Men's 1.5 km sprint	2:59.40	32	Did not advance					31
Lyubov Yegorova	Women's 1.5 km sprint	3:18.46	15 Q	3:16.0	3	Did not advance			11

== Curling ==
Women's

Team: Olga Zharkova (skip), Nkeirouka Ezekh, Yana Nekrasova, Anastassia Skoultan.

Round Robin

Rank	Team	Skip	Won	Lost
1	Canada	Kelley Law	8	1
2	Switzerland	Luzia Ebnöther	7	2
3	United States	Kari Erickson	6	3
4	Germany	Natalie Neßler	5	4
5	Sweden	Elisabet Gustafson	5	4
6	Great Britain	Rhona Martin	5	4
7	Norway	Dordi Nordby	4	5
8	Japan	Akiko Katoh	2	7
8	Denmark	Lene Bidstrup	2	7
10	Russia	Olga Zharkova	1	8

Draw 1

Team	1	2	3	4	5	6	7	8	9	10	Final
Russia (Zharkova) 🔨	0	1	1	0	0	1	0	0	2	0	5
Germany (Neßler)	1	0	0	1	1	0	0	1	0	4	8

;Draw 2

Team	1	2	3	4	5	6	7	8	9	10	11	Final
Switzerland (Ebnöther) 🔨	0	0	0	0	2	0	0	2	0	1	1	7
Russia (Zharkova)	1	0	2	0	0	0	1	0	3	0	0	6

;Draw 3

Team	1	2	3	4	5	6	7	8	9	10	Final
Canada (Law)	0	0	0	1	1	0	3	0	2	0	7
Russia (Zharkova) 🔨	0	0	1	0	0	1	0	2	0	2	6

;Draw 5

Team	1	2	3	4	5	6	7	8	9	10	Final
Russia (Zharkova)	0	0	0	1	0	1	0	1	0	2	5
Great Britain (Martin) 🔨	1	1	1	0	1	0	2	0	2	0	8

;Draw 6

Team	1	2	3	4	5	6	7	8	9	10	Final
Russia (Zharkova) 🔨	1	0	1	2	0	2	0	0	1	0	7
Denmark (Bidstrup)	0	0	0	0	1	0	2	1	0	1	5

;Draw 7

Team	1	2	3	4	5	6	7	8	9	10	Final
Norway (Nordby) 🔨	0	0	1	1	0	3	0	0	0	0	5
Russia (Zharkova)	0	0	0	0	1	0	1	1	0	1	4

;Draw 8

Team	1	2	3	4	5	6	7	8	9	10	Final
Russia (Zharkova)	0	0	0	1	0	1	0	1	0	1	4
United States (Erickson) 🔨	2	1	0	0	4	0	1	0	3	0	11

;Draw 10

Team	1	2	3	4	5	6	7	8	9	10	Final
Russia (Zharkova) 🔨	1	0	1	0	1	0	1	1	0	1	6
Japan (Katoh)	0	2	0	2	0	2	0	0	1	0	7

;Draw 12

Team	1	2	3	4	5	6	7	8	9	10	Final
Sweden (Gustafson)	2	0	0	4	0	1	0	0	2	0	9
Russia (Zharkova) 🔨	0	0	1	0	1	0	2	1	0	1	6

;

== Figure skating ==
Athlete	Event	CD1	CD2	SP/OD	FS/FD	Points	Rank
Alexander Abt	Men's			5	5	7.5	5
Evgeni Plushenko	Men's			4	2	4.0	2nd place, silver medalist(s)
Alexei Yagudin	Men's			1	1	1.5	1st place, gold medalist(s)
Maria Butyrskaya	Ladies'			5	6	8.5	6
Irina Slutskaya	Ladies'			2	2	3.0	2nd place, silver medalist(s)
Viktoria Volchkova	Ladies'			12	10	16.0	9
Elena Berezhnaya; Anton Sikharulidze	Pairs			1	n/a	n/a	1st place, gold medalist(s)
Maria Petrova; Alexei Tikhonov	Pairs			6	6	9.0	6
Tatiana Totmianina; Maxim Marinin	Pairs			4	4	6.0	4
Irina Lobacheva; Ilia Averbukh	Ice dance	2	2	2	2	4.0	2nd place, silver medalist(s)
Tatiana Navka; Roman Kostomarov	Ice dance	9	9	9	10	19.0	10

== Freestyle skiing ==
Men

Athlete	Event	Qualifying		Final	
Athlete	Event	Points	Rank	Points	Rank
Dmitri Arkhipov	Aerials	212.70	15	did not advance	
Vitali Glushchenko	Moguls	24.20	17	did not advance	
Vladimir Lebedev	Aerials	213.84	14	did not advance	
Aleksandr Mikhaylov	Aerials	146.63	23	did not advance	
Vladimir Tyumentsev	Moguls	18.42	27	did not advance	

Women

Athlete	Event	Qualifying		Final	
Athlete	Event	Points	Rank	Points	Rank
Marina Cherkasova	Moguls	22.44	12 Q	23.52	9
Lyudmila Dymchenko	Moguls	20.79	23	did not advance	
Olga Korolyova	Aerials	161.52	11 Q	188.37	4
Olga Lazarenko	Moguls	21.08	22	did not advance	
Nataliya Orekhova	Aerials	169.53	6 Q	170.54	7
Yelena Vorona	Moguls	22.35	16 Q	23.17	11
Anna Zukal	Aerials	169.19	7 Q	174.24	6

== Ice hockey ==
=== Men ===
Head coach: Viacheslav Fetisov

Assistant coaches: Vladislav Tretiak, Vladimir Yurzinov

No.	Pos.	Name	Height	Weight	Birthdate	2001–02 team
2	D	Boris Mironov	1.91 m (6 ft 3 in)	102 kg (225 lb)	21 March 1972	(United States) Chicago Blackhawks
5	D	Daniil Markov	1.84 m (6 ft 0 in)	86 kg (190 lb)	30 July 1976	(United States) Phoenix Coyotes
7	D	Oleg Tverdovsky	1.85 m (6 ft 1 in)	84 kg (185 lb)	18 May 1976	(United States) Mighty Ducks of Anaheim
8	F	Igor Larionov – C	1.76 m (5 ft 9 in)	77 kg (170 lb)	3 December 1960	(United States) Detroit Red Wings
10	F	Pavel Bure – A	1.78 m (5 ft 10 in)	86 kg (190 lb)	31 March 1971	(United States) Florida Panthers
11	D	Darius Kasparaitis – A	1.82 m (6 ft 0 in)	97 kg (214 lb)	16 October 1972	(United States) Pittsburgh Penguins
12	F	Oleg Kvasha	1.95 m (6 ft 5 in)	98 kg (216 lb)	26 July 1978	(United States) New York Islanders
13	F	Alexei Zhamnov	1.85 m (6 ft 1 in)	88 kg (194 lb)	1 October 1970	(United States) Chicago Blackhawks
14	F	Sergei Samsonov	1.76 m (5 ft 9 in)	83 kg (183 lb)	27 October 1978	(United States) Boston Bruins
20	F	Valeri Bure	1.78 m (5 ft 10 in)	84 kg (185 lb)	13 June 1974	(United States) Florida Panthers
23	D	Vladimir Malakhov	1.94 m (6 ft 4 in)	105 kg (231 lb)	30 August 1968	(United States) New York Rangers
26	F	Pavel Datsyuk	1.80 m (5 ft 11 in)	82 kg (181 lb)	20 July 1978	(United States) Detroit Red Wings
27	F	Alexei Kovalev	1.87 m (6 ft 2 in)	100 kg (220 lb)	24 February 1973	(United States) Pittsburgh Penguins
29	D	Igor Kravchuk	1.86 m (6 ft 1 in)	99 kg (218 lb)	13 September 1966	(Canada) Calgary Flames
30	G	Ilya Bryzgalov	1.91 m (6 ft 3 in)	91 kg (201 lb)	22 June 1980	(United States) Cincinnati Mighty Ducks
31	G	Yegor Podomatsky	1.76 m (5 ft 9 in)	76 kg (168 lb)	22 November 1976	(Russia) Lokomotiv Yaroslavl
33	F	Andrei Nikolishin	1.82 m (6 ft 0 in)	82 kg (181 lb)	25 March 1973	(United States) Washington Capitals
35	G	Nikolai Khabibulin	1.85 m (6 ft 1 in)	80 kg (176 lb)	13 January 1973	(United States) Tampa Bay Lightning
55	D	Sergei Gonchar	1.86 m (6 ft 1 in)	94 kg (207 lb)	13 April 1974	(United States) Washington Capitals
61	F	Maxim Afinogenov	1.80 m (5 ft 11 in)	80 kg (176 lb)	4 September 1979	(United States) Buffalo Sabres
71	F	Ilya Kovalchuk	1.85 m (6 ft 1 in)	86 kg (190 lb)	15 April 1983	(United States) Atlanta Thrashers
79	F	Alexei Yashin	1.92 m (6 ft 4 in)	99 kg (218 lb)	5 November 1973	(United States) New York Islanders
91	F	Sergei Fedorov	1.86 m (6 ft 1 in)	91 kg (201 lb)	13 December 1969	(United States) Detroit Red Wings

Preliminary round

Team	GP	W	L	T	GF	GA	PTS
United States	3	2	0	1	16	3	5
Finland	3	2	1	0	11	8	4
Russia	3	1	1	1	9	9	3
Belarus	3	0	3	0	6	22	0

15 February 2002; 11:05	Russia	6 – 4 (3-1, 1-2, 2-1)	Belarus	E Center; Attendance: 8484

Nikolai Khabibulin
Goalies
Sergei Shabanov (out 20:00)
Andrei Mezin (in 20:00)
Referee:
(Canada) Stephen Walkom

Samsonov (Kovalchuk, Fedorov) – 1:45	1 – 0
	1 – 1	8:20 – Antonenko (V. Pankov)
Zhamnov (P. Bure) – 17:32 (PP)	2 – 1
Kovalchuk – 19:39	3 – 1
Yashin – 25:16	4 – 1
	4 – 2	26:42 – Khmyl (PP)
	4 – 3	34:01 – Kalyuzhny (PP)
Mironov (Afinogenov) – 42:21	5 – 3
Fedorov (Afinogenov) – 44:04	6 – 3
	6 – 4	58:23 – Salei (Tsyplakov, Khmyl) (PP)

8 min
Penalties
10 min
36
Shots
33

16 February 2002; 21:31	United States	2 – 2 (0-0, 1-1, 1-1)	Russia	E Center; Attendance: 8599

Mike Richter
Goalies
Nikolai Khabibulin (out 59:57)
Referee:
(Canada) Bill McCreary

Tkachuk (Leetch, Rafalski) – 26:19 (PP2)	1 – 0
	1 – 1	37:08 – V. Bure (Malakhov) PP
	1 – 2	42:06 – Fedorov (Kovalchuk, Samsonov) PP
Hull (Housley, Modano) – 55:30	2 – 2

10 min
Penalties
8 min
25
Shots
35

18 February 2002; 13:30	Russia	1 – 3 (1-0, 0-2, 0-1)	Finland	Peaks Ice Arena; Attendance: 6360

Nikolai Khabibulin
Goalies
Jani Hurme
Referee:
(Canada) Dennis LaRue

P. Bure (Kravchuk) – 7:49	1 – 0
	1 – 1	30:57 – Selänne (Väänänen)
	1 – 2	36:15 – Eloranta (Ylönen, Kapanen)
	1 – 3	40:33 – Lehtinen (Kapanen, Nieminen) (PP)

10 min
Penalties
8 min
26
Shots
29

Play-off
Quarterfinal

20 February 2002; 13:30	Czech Republic	0 – 1 (0-0, 0-1, 0-0)	Russia	Peaks Ice Arena; Attendance: 5219

Dominik Hašek (out 59:47)	Goalies	Nikolai Khabibulin	Referee: (Canada) Stephen Walkom
0 – 1 / 24:48 – Afinogenov (Nikolishin, Malakhov)			Referee: (Canada) Stephen Walkom
6 min	Penalties	22 min	Referee: (Canada) Stephen Walkom
41	Shots	27	Referee: (Canada) Stephen Walkom

Semifinal

22 February 2002; 16:20	Russia	2 – 3 (0-1, 0-2, 2-0)	United States	E Center; Attendance: 8599

Nikolai Khabibulin (out 59:15)
Goalies
Mike Richter
Referee:
(Canada) Bill McCreary

	0 – 1	15:56 – Guerin (PP)
	0 – 2	27:31 – Young (Housley, Leetch) PP
	0 – 3	37:39 – Housley (Amonte) PP
Kovalev (Markov, Tverdovsky) – 40:11	1 – 3
Malakhov – 43:21	2 – 3

12 min
Penalties
8 min
30
Shots
49

Bronze game

23 February 2002; 12:15	Belarus	2 – 7 (1-2, 1-2, 0-3)	Russia	E Center; Attendance: 8599

Andrei Mezin (out 11:20)
Sergei Shabanov (in 11:20)
Goalies
Nikolai Khabibulin
Referee:
(Sweden) Ulf Radbjer

	0 – 1	5:28 – Kovalev (Larionov)
Pankov (Tsyplakov) – 9:21	1 – 1
	1 – 2	11:20 – Kasparaitis (Larionov, Kovalev)
Dudik (Kopat) – 21:15	2 – 2
	2 – 3	23:11 – Tverdovsky (Fedorov, Yashin) (PP)
	2 – 4	23:34 – Datsyuk (Kravchuk)
	2 – 5	47:47 – Kovalev (Datsyuk, Larionov)
	2 – 6	52:30 – P. Bure (Datsyuk)
	2 – 7	59:11 – Afinogenov (Samsonov, Malakhov)

12 min
Penalties
8 min
23
Shots
45

Bronze

=== Women ===
The following is the Russia women's national ice hockey team roster for the women's ice hockey tournament at the 2002 Winter Olympics.

Head coach: (Russia) Viacheslav Dolgushin Assistant coach: (Russia) Andrey Anisimov, (Russia) Igor Prusov

No.	Pos.	Name	Height	Weight	Birthdate	Birthplace	2001–02 team
2	D	Maria Barykina – A	1.70 m (5 ft 7 in)	60 kg (130 lb)	9 December 1973	Moscow, Soviet Union	(Russia) SKIF Moscow
3	D	Kristina Petrovskaya	1.68 m (5 ft 6 in)	67 kg (148 lb)	3 June 1980	Moscow, Soviet Union	(United States) Minnesota Duluth Bulldogs
4	D	Alena Khomich	1.66 m (5 ft 5 in)	58 kg (128 lb)	26 February 1981	Pervouralsk, Soviet Union	(Russia) Spartak Yekaterinburg
7	D	Elena Bobrova	1.70 m (5 ft 7 in)	63 kg (139 lb)	23 August 1974	Krasnoyarsk, Soviet Union	(Russia) SKIF Moscow
10	F	Larisa Mishina	1.68 m (5 ft 6 in)	71 kg (157 lb)	10 September 1975	Moscow, Soviet Union	(Russia) SKIF Moscow
11	F	Tatiana Sotnikova	1.66 m (5 ft 5 in)	61 kg (134 lb)	20 January 1981	Moscow, Soviet Union	(Russia) SKIF Moscow
12	F	Yulia Gladysheva	1.66 m (5 ft 5 in)	56 kg (123 lb)	4 December 1981	Moscow, Soviet Union	(Russia) SKIF Moscow
15	D	Olga Permyakova	1.68 m (5 ft 6 in)	64 kg (141 lb)	12 April 1982	Chelyabinsk, Soviet Union	(Russia) Spartak Chelyabinsk
17	F	Ekaterina Smolentseva	1.70 m (5 ft 7 in)	66 kg (146 lb)	15 September 1981	Pervouralsk, Soviet Union	(Russia) Spartak Yekaterinburg
18	F	Tatyana Tsaryova	1.64 m (5 ft 5 in)	56 kg (123 lb)	30 December 1977		(Russia) SKIF Moscow
20	G	Irina Gashennikova	1.59 m (5 ft 3 in)	61 kg (134 lb)	11 May 1975	Pushkino, Soviet Union	(Russia) SKIF Moscow
21	F	Svetlana Trefilova	1.64 m (5 ft 5 in)	66 kg (146 lb)	20 May 1973	Sverdlovsk, Soviet Union	(Russia) SKIF Moscow
22	F	Svetlana Terentieva	1.65 m (5 ft 5 in)	61 kg (134 lb)	25 September 1983	Pervouralsk, Soviet Union	(Russia) Spartak Yekaterinburg
23	F	Tatiana Burina	1.64 m (5 ft 5 in)	62 kg (137 lb)	20 March 1980	Novosibirsk, Soviet Union	(Russia) SKIF Moscow
25	F	Ekaterina Pashkevich – A	1.80 m (5 ft 11 in)	73 kg (161 lb)	19 September 1972	Moscow, Soviet Union	(United States) Boston College Eagles
26	D	Olga Savenkova	1.79 m (5 ft 10 in)	61 kg (134 lb)	2 July 1982	Krasnoyarsk, Soviet Union	(Russia) Lokomotiv Krasnoyarsk
27	F	Elena Byalkovskaya	1.79 m (5 ft 10 in)	76 kg (168 lb)	22 March 1977	Moscow, Soviet Union	(Russia) SKIF Moscow
28	F	Oxana Tretiyakova	1.64 m (5 ft 5 in)	76 kg (168 lb)	10 March 1979	Krasnoyarsk, Soviet Union	(Russia) SKIF Moscow
29	D	Zhanna Shchelchkova – C	1.64 m (5 ft 5 in)	75 kg (165 lb)	10 February 1969	Moscow, Soviet Union	(Russia) SKIF Moscow
30	G	Irina Votintseva	1.64 m (5 ft 5 in)	64 kg (141 lb)	19 September 1970		(Russia) Spartak Yekaterinburg

Preliminary round

Team	GP	W	L	T	GF	GA	PTS
Canada	3	3	0	0	25	0	6
Sweden	3	2	1	0	10	13	4
Russia	3	1	0	1	6	11	2
Kazakhstan	3	0	3	0	1	28	0

11 February 2002; 14:00	Sweden	3 – 2 (2-0, 1-2, 0-0)	Russia	Peaks Ice Arena; Attendance: 5241

Annica Åhlén
Goalies
Irina Gashennikova
Referee:
(United States) Krista Knight

Edstrand (Rooth, Holst) – 8:14 (PP)	1 – 0
Almblad (Pettersson) – 15:15	2 – 0
Bergstrand – 24:11	3 – 0
	3 – 1	25:07 – Pashkevich
	3 – 2	36:04 – Mishina (Permyakova)

4 min
Penalties
10 min
44
Shots
14

13 February 2002; 11:05	Russia	0 – 7 (0-2, 0-2, 0-3)	Canada	E Center; Attendance: 8213

Irina Gashennikova
Goalies
Sami Jo Small
Referee:
(Finland) Anu Hirvonen

0 – 1	11:37 – Wickenheiser
0 – 2	18:00 – Goyette (Wickenheiser)
0 – 3	20:31 – Antal (Ouellette, Heaney)
0 – 4	29:14 – Piper (Ouellette, Botterill)
0 – 5	47:48 – Botterill (Sunohara, Brisson) (PP)
0 – 6	58:12 – Chartrand
0 – 7	58:50 – Goyette (Wickenheiser)

18 min
Penalties
4 min
6
Shots
60

15 February 2002; 14:00	Kazakhstan	1 – 4 (1-1, 0-2, 0-1)	Russia	Peaks Ice Arena; Attendance: 5618

Natalya Trunova
Goalies
Irina Gashennikova
Referee:
(United States) Stacey Livingston

	0 – 1	4:43 – Pashkevich
Yakovchuk (Potapova, Vasina) – 10:36 (PP)	1 – 1
	1 – 2	26:24 – Terentyeva (Smolentseva)
	1 – 3	35:03 – Burina (Smolentseva, Trefilova)
	1 – 4	47:37 – Tsareva

16 min
Penalties
16 min
18
Shots
52

Play-off
Classification 5/8 places

17 February 2002; 14:00	Russia	4 – 1 (0-1, 3-0, 1-0)	China	Peaks Ice Arena; Attendance: 5719

Irina Gashennikova
Goalies
Guo Hong
Referee:
(Canada) Laura Vanderhorst

	0 – 1	1:12 – Yang
Mishina (Byalkovskaya) – 22:07	1 – 1
Pashkevich (Schelchkova) – 24:29 (PP)	2 – 1
Burina (Smolentseva, Trefilova) – 24:49	3 – 1
Tsareva (Pashkevich) – 52:05 PP	4 – 1

14 min
Penalties
24 min
41
Shots
31

Classification 5/6 places

19 February 2002; 19:00	Russia	5 – 0 (2-0, 1-0, 2-0)	Germany	Peaks Ice Arena; Attendance: 5781

Irina Gashennikova
Goalies
Stephanie Wartosch-Kurten
Referee:
(Finland) Anne Haanpaa

Tatiana Burina (Pashkevich) – 3:24	1 – 0
Burina (Schelchkova, Bobrova) – 7:41	2 – 0
Tsareva (Bobrova, Schelchkova) – 33:31 (PP)	3 – 0
Smolentseva – 40:51	4 – 0
Trefilova – 45:35 PP	5 – 0

12 min
Penalties
12 min
42
Shots
25

== Luge ==
Athlete	Event	Final					
Athlete	Event	Run 1	Run 2	Run 3	Run 4	Total	Rank
Albert Demtschenko	Men's singles	44.756	44.732	44.534	44.974	2:58.996	5
Viktor Kneib	Men's singles	45.333	45.034	44.796	45.102	3:00.265	20
Aleksei Gorlachev	Men's singles	45.156	45.131	45.010	45.271	3:00.568	21
Margarita Klimenko	Women's singles	43.889	43.951	43.920	43.800	2:55.560	14
Anastasia Antonova	Women's singles	44.034	43.840	43.967	43.828	2:55.669	15
Anastasiya Skulkina	Women's singles	44.657	44.464	44.934	44.800	2:58.855	27
Danil Chaban; Yevgeny Zykov	Doubles	43.691	43.895			1:27.586	13
Mikhail Kuzmich; Jury Veselov	Doubles	43.815	43.844			1:27.659	14

== Nordic combined ==
Athlete	Event	Ski Jumping		Cross-Country		
Athlete	Event	Points	Rank	Deficit	Time	Rank
Aleksei Barannikov	Individual 15 km	227.0	17	3:23	44:07.3 +4:55.6	23
Alexey Fadeyev	Individual 15 km	214.5	28	4:25	44:49.0 +5:37.3	31
Vladimir Lysenin	Individual 15 km	195.0	40	6:03	45:21.5; 6:09.8	35
Aleksei Tsvetkov	Individual 15 km	212.0	30	4:38	44:28.2; 5:16.5	27
Alexey Fadeyev; Aleksei Tsvetkov; Vladimir Lysenin; Aleksei Barannikov	Team	821.0	9	3:40	Did Not Stasrt	

== Short track speed skating ==
Women

Athlete	Event	Heat		Quarterfinal		Semifinal		Final	
Athlete	Event	Time	Rank	Time	Rank	Time	Rank	Time	Rank
Nataliya Dmitriyeva	500 m	46.574	3	did not advance					20
Nataliya Dmitriyeva	1000 m	1:50.132	3	did not advance					24
Nataliya Dmitriyeva	1500 m	2:29.086	5			did not advance			21
Nina Yevteyeva	500 m	46.180	3	did not advance					19
Nina Yevteyeva	1000 m	1:46.673	2 Q	1:36.519	4	did not advance			15
Nina Yevteyeva	1500 m	2:32.970	2 Q			2:32.759	3	32:32.666	Final B 10

== Skeleton ==
Athlete	Event	Final			
Athlete	Event	Run 1	Run 2	Total	Rank
Konstantin Aladachvili	Men's	52.92	52.67	1:45.59	22
Yekaterina Mironova	Women's	52.97	52.98	1:45.95	7

== Ski jumping ==
Athlete	Event	Qualification		First Round		Final		
Athlete	Event	Points	Rank	Points	Rank	Points	Total	Rank
Valery Kobelev	Normal hill	118.0	5 Q	111.0	29	113.5	224.5	29
Valery Kobelev	Large hill	103.6	11 Q	115.3	19	116.2	231.5	17
Ildar Fatchullin	Normal hill	89.0	41	did not advance				
Ildar Fatchullin	Large hill	102.3	13 Q	103.1	35	did not advance		35
Aleksandr Belov	Normal hill	88.5	42	did not advance				
Aleksandr Belov	Large hill	83.0	34 Q	66.7	50	did not advance		50
Aleksey Silayev	Normal hill	56.0	48	did not advance				
Anton Kalinichenko	Large hill	61.3	47	did not advance				

== Snowboarding ==
Parallel GS

Athlete	Event	Qualification		Round of 16	Quarterfinals	Semifinals	Finals	
Athlete	Event	Time	Rank	Opposition Time	Opposition Time	Opposition Time	Opposition Time	Rank
Mariya Tikhvinskaya	Women's parallel giant slalom	42.97	15	Ruby (FRA) (2); L -2.89 (-2.07 -0.82)	did not advance			15

== Speed skating ==
Men

Athlete	Event	Race 1		Race 2		Final	
Athlete	Event	Time	Rank	Time	Rank	Time	Rank
Dmitry Dorofeyev	500 m	35.48	19	35.27	20	70.75	18
Aleksandr Kibalko	1500 m					1:47.63	22
Sergey Klevchenya	500 m	35.10	11	35.18	18	70.28	13
Sergey Klevchenya	1000 m					1:08.41	9
Yuri Kokhanets	5000 m					6:36.48	27
Yevgeny Lalenkov	1000 m					1:09.55	23
Yevgeny Lalenkov	1500 m					1:45.97	10
Dmitry Lobkov	500 m	35.09	10	35.01	14	70.10	11
Dmitry Lobkov	1000 m					1:09.20	18
Vadim Sayutin	5000 m					6:35.33	25
Vadim Sayutin	1500 m					1:49.45	37
Dmitri Shepel	5000 m					6:21.85	4
Dmitri Shepel	1500 m					1:45.98	11
Dmitri Shepel	10000 m					13:23.83	6

Women

Athlete	Event	Race 1		Race 2		Final	
Athlete	Event	Time	Rank	Time	Rank	Time	Rank
Varvara Barysheva	3000 m					4:08.02	14
Varvara Barysheva	1000 m					1:16.49	20
Varvara Barysheva	1500 m					1:56.44	10
Varvara Barysheva	5000 m					6:56.97	5
Svetlana Kaykan	500 m	38.05	10	38.26	11	76.31	10
Svetlana Kaykan	1000 m					1:16.93	23
Tatyana Trapeznikova	3000 m					4:08.49	15
Tatyana Trapeznikova	1500 m					1:59.00	17
Valentina Yakshina	3000 m					4:11.48	17
Valentina Yakshina	1500 m					1:59.28	18
Valentina Yakshina	5000 m					7:08.42	11
Svetlana Zhurova	500 m	37.55	4	38.09	8	75.64	7
Svetlana Zhurova	1000 m					1:15.02	11
