= Russia at the 2006 Winter Olympics =

- IOC code: RUS
- NOC: Russian Olympic Committee
- Website: www.roc.ru (in Russian)

in Turin
- Competitors: 190 in 15 sports
- Flag bearers: Dmitry Dorofeev (opening); Evgeni Plushenko (closing)
- Medals Ranked 4th: Gold 8 Silver 6 Bronze 8 Total 22

Winter Olympics appearances (overview)
- 1994; 1998; 2002; 2006; 2010; 2014; 2018–2026

Other related appearances
- Soviet Union (1956–1988); Unified Team (1992); Olympic Athletes from Russia (2018); ROC (2022); Individual Neutral Athletes (2026)

Russia participated at the 2006 Winter Olympics in Turin, Italy. It sent a total of 190 athletes to participate in all 15 of the Winter Olympic sports.

Dmitry Dorofeev, a speed skater, served as flag bearer at the opening ceremonies.

== Medalists ==
Medal	Name	Sport	Event	Date
Gold	Yevgeny Dementyev	Cross-country skiing	Men's 30 km pursuit	12 February
Gold	Svetlana Ishmuratova	Biathlon	Women's individual	13 February
Gold	Tatiana Totmianina; Maxim Marinin	Figure skating	Pairs	13 February
Gold	Svetlana Zhurova	Speed skating	Women's 500 m	14 February
Gold	Evgeni Plushenko	Figure skating	Men's	16 February
Gold	Natalia Baranova-Masolkina; Larisa Kurkina; Yuliya Chepalova; Yevgeniya Medvedeva-Arbuzova	Cross-country skiing	Women's 4 x 5 km relay	18 February
Gold	Tatiana Navka; Roman Kostomarov	Figure skating	Ice dance	20 February
Gold	Albina Akhatova; Anna Bogaliy; Svetlana Ishmuratova; Olga Zaitseva	Biathlon	Women's relay	23 February
Silver	Albert Demtschenko	Luge	Men's singles	12 February
Silver	Dmitry Dorofeev	Speed skating	Men's 500 m	13 February
Silver	Sergei Tchepikov; Nikolay Kruglov Jr. Pavel Rostovtsev; Ivan Tcherezov	Biathlon	Men's relay	21 February
Silver	Yuliya Chepalova	Cross-country skiing	Women's 30 km freestyle	24 February
Silver	Alexandr Zubkov; Filipp Yegorov; Alexei Seliverstov; Alexey Voyevoda	Bobsleigh	Four-man	25 February
Silver	Yevgeny Dementyev	Cross-country skiing	Men's 50 km freestyle	26 February
Bronze	Yevgeniya Medvedeva-Arbuzova	Cross-country skiing	Women's 15 km pursuit	12 February
Bronze	Albina Akhatova	Biathlon	Women's individual	13 February
Bronze	Ivan Alypov; Vasily Rochev	Cross-country skiing	Men's team sprint	14 February
Bronze	Yekaterina Abramova; Varvara Barysheva; Yekaterina Lobysheva; Galina Likhachova; Svetlana Vysokova	Speed skating	Women's team pursuit	16 February
Bronze	Albina Akhatova	Biathlon	Women's pursuit	18 February
Bronze	Alyona Sidko	Cross-country skiing	Women's sprint	22 February
Bronze	Irina Slutskaya	Figure skating	Ladies'	23 February
Bronze	Vladimir Lebedev	Freestyle skiing	Men's aerials	23 February

- Olga Pyleva won the silver in the women's 15 km race, but was later disqualified for failing a drug test.

== Alpine skiing ==
Athlete	Event	Final				
Athlete	Event	Run 1	Run 2	Run 3	Total	Rank
Olesya Aliyeva	Women's downhill	n/a			2:02.06	33
Olesya Aliyeva	Women's super-G	n/a			1:37.12	42
Olesya Aliyeva	Women's giant slalom	disqualified				
Pavel Shestakov	Men's downhill	n/a			1:51.93	30
Pavel Shestakov	Men's super-G	n/a			1:33.48	29
Pavel Shestakov	Men's giant slalom	did not finish				
Pavel Shestakov	Men's slalom	did not start				
Pavel Shestakov	Men's combined	1:51.93	49.11	47.32	3:16.84	24
Aleksandr Khoroshilov	Men's downhill	n/a			1:54.70	38
Aleksandr Khoroshilov	Men's super-G	n/a			1:35.51	41
Aleksandr Khoroshilov	Men's slalom	did not finish				
Aleksandr Khoroshilov	Men's combined	1:42.35	46.92	46.19	3:15.46	22
Anton Konovalov	Men's super-G	n/a			1:35.72	42
Anton Konovalov	Men's slalom	59.53	55.18	n/a	1:54.71	29
Anton Konovalov	Men's combined	1:45.12	56.15	did not finish		
Konstantin Sats	Men's downhill	n/a			1:55.03	40
Konstantin Sats	Men's super-G	n/a			1:33.14	27
Konstantin Sats	Men's giant slalom	did not finish				
Konstantin Sats	Men's combined	1:41.02	did not start			
Dmitry Ulyanov	Men's giant slalom	did not finish				
Dmitry Ulyanov	Men's slalom	did not finish				

Note: In the men's combined, run 1 is the downhill, and runs 2 and 3 are the slalom. In the women's combined, run 1 and 2 are the slalom, and run 3 the downhill.

== Biathlon ==
Olga Pyleva was stripped of her silver medal in the women's individual after testing positive for carphedon, a stimulant.

Men

Athlete	Event	Final		
Athlete	Event	Time	Misses	Rank
Nikolay Kruglov Jr.	Sprint	28:05.2	1	21
Nikolay Kruglov Jr.	Pursuit	37:18.9	1	11
Nikolay Kruglov Jr.	Mass start	49:20.1	2	21
Pavel Rostovtsev	Individual	56:47.2	2	13
Sergei Rozhkov	Mass start	49:09.7	2	20
Sergei Tchepikov	Sprint	28:08.1	1	23
Sergei Tchepikov	Pursuit	did not start		
Sergei Tchepikov	Mass start	47:59.1	0	5
Sergei Tchepikov	Individual	55:32.7	1	4
Ivan Tcherezov	Sprint	27:09.0	0	5
Ivan Tcherezov	Pursuit	37:29.7	3	15
Ivan Tcherezov	Individual	56:05.7	2	8
Maxim Tchoudov	Sprint	27:20.5	0	9
Maxim Tchoudov	Pursuit	36:41.4	4	9
Maxim Tchoudov	Mass start	48:40.2	4	15
Maxim Tchoudov	Individual	59:12.0	5	32
Ivan Tcherezov; Sergei Tchepikov; Pavel Rostovtsev; Nikolay Kruglov Jr.	Relay	1:22:12.4	6	Silver medal

Women

Athlete	Event	Final		
Athlete	Event	Time	Misses	Rank
Albina Akhatova	Sprint	22:40.2	0	4
Albina Akhatova	Pursuit	38:05.0	1	Bronze medal
Albina Akhatova	Mass start	42:19.5	2	9
Albina Akhatova	Individual	50:55.0	2	Bronze medal
Anna Bogaliy-Titovets	Individual	55:18.4	5	35
Natalia Guseva	Mass start	44:55.1	5	24
Svetlana Ishmouratova	Sprint	23:10.3	1	10
Svetlana Ishmouratova	Pursuit	38:29.0	3	4
Svetlana Ishmouratova	Mass start	42:33.5	4	12
Svetlana Ishmouratova	Individual	49:24.1	1	Gold medal
Olga Pyleva	Sprint	did not start		
Olga Pyleva	Individual	disqualified		
Olga Zaitseva	Sprint	23:05.8	0	9
Olga Zaitseva	Pursuit	40:49.0	5	19
Olga Zaitseva	Mass start	42:58.3	1	15
Anna Bogaliy; Svetlana Ishmouratova; Olga Zaitseva; Albina Akhatova	Relay	1:16:12.5	2	Gold medal

== Bobsleigh ==
Athlete	Event	Final					
Athlete	Event	Run 1	Run 2	Run 3	Run 4	Total	Rank
Alexandr Zubkov; Alexey Voyevoda	Two-man	55.54	55.85	56.12	56.49	3:44.00	4
Yevgeni Popov; Roman Oreshnikov	Two-man	56.56	56.50	56.98	57.29	3:47.33	18
Viktoria Tokovaya; Nadezhda Orlova	Two-woman	57.64	57.72	58.44	58.13	3:51.93	7
Yevgeni Popov; Sergey Golubev; Pyotr Makarchuk; Dmitriy Stepushkin	Four-man	55.87	55.57	55.16	55.33	3:41.93	9
Alexandr Zubkov; Filipp Yegorov; Alexei Seliverstov; Alexey Voyevoda	Four-man	55.22	55.45	54.87	55.01	3:40.55	Silver medal

== Cross-country skiing ==
Distance

Men

Athlete	Event	Final	
Athlete	Event	Total	Rank
Ivan Arteev	15 km classical	40:49.1	34
Ivan Arteev	30 km pursuit	1:22:36.2	51
Ivan Babikov	15 km classical	39:59.5	22
Ivan Babikov	30 km pursuit	1:17:17.2	13
Ivan Babikov	50 km freestyle	2:08:07.9	38
Yevgeny Dementyev	30 km pursuit	1:17:00.8	Gold medal
Yevgeny Dementyev	50 km freestyle	2:06:12.6	Silver medal
Alexander Legkov	30 km pursuit	1:20:28.2	37
Alexander Legkov	50 km freestyle	2:06:39.7	20
Sergei Novikov	15 km classical	39:15.0	8
Nikolay Pankratov	50 km freestyle	2:06:33.9	18
Vasily Rochev	15 km classical	38:24.4	4
Sergei Novikov; Vasily Rochev; Ivan Alypov; Yevgeny Dementyev	4 x 10 km relay	1:45:09.9	6

Women

Athlete	Event	Final	
Athlete	Event	Total	Rank
Natalia Baranova-Masolkina	10 km classical	29:30.9	16
Yelena Burukhina	15 km pursuit	46:42.9	37
Yuliya Chepalova	10 km classical	30:04.7	26
Yuliya Chepalova	15 km pursuit	43:39.5	9
Yuliya Chepalova	30 km freestyle	1:22:26.8	Silver medal
Larisa Kurkina	10 km classical	29:36.8	19
Yevgeniya Medvedeva-Arbuzova	15 km pursuit	43:03.2	Bronze medal
Yevgeniya Medvedeva-Arbuzova	30 km freestyle	1:26:28.1	21
Olga Moskalenko-Rocheva	30 km freestyle	1:25:45.0	18
Olga Zavyalova	10 km classical	29:57.6	24
Olga Zavyalova	15 km pursuit	43:23.72	7
Olga Zavyalova	30 km freestyle	1:23:28.5	9
Natalia Baranova-Masolkina; Larisa Kurkina; Yuliya Chepalova; Yevgeniya Medvedeva-Arbuzova	4 x 5 km relay	54:47.7	Gold medal

Sprint

Athlete	Event	Qualifying		Quarterfinal		Semifinal		Final	
Athlete	Event	Total	Rank	Total	Rank	Total	Rank	Total	Rank
Ivan Alypov	Men's sprint	2:20.21	27 Q	2:24.7	6	Did not advance			28
Yuliya Chepalova	Women's sprint	2:16.90	22 Q	2:16.6	6	Did not advance			27
Pavel Korostelev	Men's sprint	2:21.00	34	Did not advance					34
Natalya Matveyeva	Women's sprint	2:17.73	34	2:31.4	6	Did not advance			30
Olga Moskalenko-Rocheva	Women's sprint	2:16.43	20 Q	2:18.4	3	Did not advance			14
Sergei Novikov	Men's sprint	2:20.29	28 Q	2:24.7	6	Did not advance			28
Vasily Rochev	Men's sprint	2:16.19	4 Q	2:22.0	3	Did not advance			11
Alyona Sidko	Women's sprint	2:14.54	5 Q	2:17.7	1 Q	2:15.1	2 Q	2:13.2	Bronze medal
Ivan Alypov; Vasily Rochev	Men's team sprint	n/a				17:22.2	2 Q	17:05.2	Bronze medal
Olga Moskalenko-Rocheva; Alyona Sidko	Women's team sprint	n/a				17:32.1	2 Q	17:08.5	6

== Curling ==
=== Women's tournament ===
Team: Ludmila Privivkova (skip), Nkeirouka Ezekh, Yana Nekrasova, Yekaterina Galkina and Olga Zharkova (alternate)

Round Robin
Draw 2

Team	1	2	3	4	5	6	7	8	9	10	Final
Russia (Privivkova) 🔨	1	0	0	0	0	1	2	0	0	3	7
Japan (Onodera)	0	0	1	1	2	0	0	1	0	0	5

;Draw 3

Team	1	2	3	4	5	6	7	8	9	10	Final
Canada (Kleibrink)	0	0	1	0	0	2	0	2	0	1	6
Russia (Privivkova) 🔨	0	0	0	1	1	0	1	0	2	0	5

;Draw 4

Team	1	2	3	4	5	6	7	8	9	10	Final
Italy (Gaspari) 🔨	1	0	1	0	1	0	1	0	0	2	6
Russia (Privivkova)	0	1	0	1	0	1	0	0	1	0	4

;Draw 5

Team	1	2	3	4	5	6	7	8	9	10	Final
Russia (Privivkova)	0	2	0	0	2	0	0	0	0	0	4
Great Britain (Martin) 🔨	2	0	4	1	0	0	0	0	2	1	10

;Draw 7

Team	1	2	3	4	5	6	7	8	9	10	11	Final
United States (Johnson)	0	0	2	0	0	0	2	0	0	3	0	7
Russia (Privivkova) 🔨	0	2	0	1	1	2	0	1	0	0	1	8

;Draw 8

Team	1	2	3	4	5	6	7	8	9	10	Final
Russia (Privivkova)	0	0	1	0	1	0	0	1	0	1	4
Switzerland (Ott) 🔨	1	2	0	1	0	0	3	0	0	0	7

;Draw 10

Team	1	2	3	4	5	6	7	8	9	10	Final
Russia (Privivkova) 🔨	1	1	0	2	1	0	1	2	0	1	9
Denmark (Holm)	0	0	2	0	0	2	0	0	3	0	7

;Draw 11

Team	1	2	3	4	5	6	7	8	9	10	Final
Sweden (Norberg) 🔨	0	0	0	2	0	0	0	1	0	1	4
Russia (Privivkova)	0	1	0	0	1	1	1	0	2	0	6

;Draw 12

Team	1	2	3	4	5	6	7	8	9	10	Final
Norway (Nordby)	0	2	0	1	0	2	0	2	1	0	8
Russia (Privivkova) 🔨	2	0	1	0	3	0	3	0	0	1	10

Standings

Rank	Team	Skip	Won	Lost
1	Sweden	Anette Norberg	7	2
2	Switzerland	Mirjam Ott	7	2
3	Canada	Shannon Kleibrink	6	3
4	Norway	Dordi Nordby	6	3
5	Great Britain	Rhona Martin	5	4
6	Russia	Ludmila Privivkova	5	4
7	Japan	Ayumi Onodera	4	5
8	Denmark	Dorthe Holm	2	7
9	United States	Cassandra Johnson	2	7
10	Italy	Diana Gaspari	1	8

== Figure skating ==
Athlete	Event	CD		SP/OD		FS/FD		Total	
Athlete	Event	Points	Rank	Points	Rank	Points	Rank	Points	Rank
Ilia Klimkin	Men's	n/a		61.61	18 Q	130.19	10	191.80	11
Evgeni Plushenko	Men's	n/a		90.66	1 Q	167.67	1	258.33	Gold medal
Irina Slutskaya	Ladies'	n/a		66.70	2 Q	114.74	3	181.44	Bronze medal
Elena Sokolova	Ladies'	n/a		46.69	18 Q	95.66	14	142.35	14
Julia Obertas; Sergei Slavnov	Pairs	n/a		60.25	8	106.29	9	166.54	8
Maria Petrova; Alexei Tikhonov	Pairs	n/a		64.27	3	117.42	6	181.69	5
Tatiana Totmianina; Maxim Marinin	Pairs	n/a		68.64	1	135.84	1	204.48	Gold medal
Oksana Domnina; Maxim Shabalin	Ice dance	33.37	9	52.36	9	88.03	9	173.76	9
Jana Khokhlova; Sergei Novitski	Ice dance	30.90	14	47.15	13	86.43	11	164.48	12
Tatiana Navka; Roman Kostomarov	Ice dance	38.20	2	61.07	1	101.37	1	200.64	Gold medal

Key: CD = Compulsory Dance, FD = Free Dance, FS = Free Skate, OD = Original Dance, SP = Short Program

== Freestyle skiing ==
Men

Athlete	Event	Qualifying		Final	
Athlete	Event	Points	Rank	Points	Rank
Dmitry Arkhipov	Aerials	did not start			
Evgeniy Brailovskiy	Aerials	222.28	12 Q	223.61	9
Vitali Glushchenko	Moguls	12.75	35	did not advance	35
Vladimir Lebedev	Aerials	241.48	5 Q	246.79	Bronze medal
Dmitry Marushchak	Aerials	did not start			
Ruslan Sharifullin	Moguls	21.24	27	did not advance	27
Alexandr Smyshlyaev	Moguls	22.18	20 Q	23.22	13
Artem Valinteev	Moguls	21.51	25	did not advance	25

Women

Athlete	Event	Qualifying		Final	
Athlete	Event	Points	Rank	Points	Rank
Marina Cherkasova	Moguls	21.82	19 Q	22.05	16
Ljudmila Dymchenko	Moguls	21.42	21	did not advance	21
Olga Koroleva	Aerials	148.40	17	did not advance	17
Daria Serova	Moguls	23.49	10 Q	22.44	13
Anna Zukal	Aerials	172.24	6 Q	152.04	9

== Ice hockey ==
=== Men's tournament ===
The Russian men's team finished the round robin portion of the competition ranked second in Group B, losing just once, to Slovakia. It beat Canada in thequarter finals, but lost both the semifinal and bronze medal game to finish fourth overall

Players

The following is the Russian roster for the men's ice hockey tournament at the 2006 Winter Olympics.

Head coach: Vladimir Krikunov

Assistant coaches: Vladimir Yurzinov, Sergei Nemchinov, Boris Mikhailov

No.	Pos.	Name	Height	Weight	Birthdate	Team
4	D	Sergei Zhukov	1.92 m (6 ft 4 in)	87 kg (192 lb)	November 23, 1975 (aged 30)	(Russia) Lokomotiv Yaroslavl
5	D	Vitaly Vishnevskiy	1.87 m (6 ft 2 in)	92 kg (203 lb)	March 18, 1980 (aged 25)	(United States) Mighty Ducks of Anaheim
6	D	Anton Volchenkov	1.85 m (6 ft 1 in)	102 kg (225 lb)	February 25, 1982 (aged 23)	(Canada) Ottawa Senators
8	F	Alexander Ovechkin	1.88 m (6 ft 2 in)	98 kg (216 lb)	October 17, 1985 (aged 20)	(United States) Washington Capitals
11	D	Darius Kasparaitis (A)	1.80 m (5 ft 11 in)	99 kg (218 lb)	October 16, 1972 (aged 33)	(United States) New York Rangers
13	F	Pavel Datsyuk	1.79 m (5 ft 10 in)	86 kg (190 lb)	July 20, 1978 (aged 27)	(United States) Detroit Red Wings
18	F	Evgeni Malkin	1.91 m (6 ft 3 in)	87 kg (192 lb)	July 31, 1986 (aged 19)	(Russia) Metallurg Magnitogorsk
20	G	Evgeni Nabokov	1.83 m (6 ft 0 in)	90 kg (198 lb)	July 25, 1975 (aged 30)	(United States) San Jose Sharks
21	F	Alexander Kharitonov	1.72 m (5 ft 8 in)	80 kg (176 lb)	March 30, 1976 (aged 29)	(Russia) Dynamo Moscow
22	F	Andrei Taratukhin	1.83 m (6 ft 0 in)	92 kg (203 lb)	February 22, 1983 (aged 22)	(Russia) Lokomotiv Yaroslavl
23	F	Ivan Nepryaev	1.88 m (6 ft 2 in)	92 kg (203 lb)	February 4, 1982 (aged 24)	(Russia) Lokomotiv Yaroslavl
24	F	Alexander Frolov	1.88 m (6 ft 2 in)	95 kg (209 lb)	June 19, 1982 (aged 23)	(United States) Los Angeles Kings
25	F	Viktor Kozlov	1.95 m (6 ft 5 in)	104 kg (229 lb)	February 14, 1975 (aged 31)	(United States) New Jersey Devils
27	F	Alexei Kovalev (C)	1.88 m (6 ft 2 in)	102 kg (225 lb)	February 24, 1973 (aged 32)	(Canada) Montreal Canadiens
29	D	Daniil Markov	1.85 m (6 ft 1 in)	86 kg (190 lb)	July 30, 1976 (aged 29)	(United States) Nashville Predators
30	G	Ilya Bryzgalov	1.88 m (6 ft 2 in)	88 kg (194 lb)	June 22, 1980 (aged 25)	(United States) Mighty Ducks of Anaheim
33	F	Maxim Sushinsky	1.72 m (5 ft 8 in)	80 kg (176 lb)	July 1, 1974 (aged 31)	(Russia) Dynamo Moscow
39	G	Maxim Sokolov	1.80 m (5 ft 11 in)	92 kg (203 lb)	May 27, 1972 (aged 33)	(Russia) SKA Saint Petersburg
51	D	Fedor Tyutin	1.88 m (6 ft 2 in)	92 kg (203 lb)	July 19, 1983 (aged 22)	(United States) New York Rangers
52	D	Andrei Markov	1.83 m (6 ft 0 in)	90 kg (198 lb)	December 20, 1978 (aged 27)	(Canada) Montreal Canadiens
55	D	Sergei Gonchar	1.85 m (6 ft 1 in)	94 kg (207 lb)	April 13, 1974 (aged 31)	(United States) Pittsburgh Penguins
61	F	Maxim Afinogenov	1.83 m (6 ft 0 in)	88 kg (194 lb)	September 4, 1979 (aged 26)	(United States) Buffalo Sabres
71	F	Ilya Kovalchuk	1.88 m (6 ft 2 in)	99 kg (218 lb)	April 15, 1983 (aged 22)	(United States) Atlanta Thrashers
79	F	Alexei Yashin (A)	1.91 m (6 ft 3 in)	100 kg (220 lb)	November 5, 1973 (aged 32)	(United States) New York Islanders
94	F	Alexander Korolyuk	1.75 m (5 ft 9 in)	80 kg (176 lb)	January 15, 1976 (aged 30)	(Russia) Vityaz Chekhov

Forwards Alexander Frolov and Alexander Korolyuk were replaced due to injuries by Andrei Taratukhin and Ivan Nepryaev, respectively.

Round-robin

Pos	Team	Pld	W	D	L	GF	GA	GD	Pts	Qualification
1	Slovakia	5	5	0	0	18	8	+10	10	Quarterfinals
2	Russia	5	4	0	1	23	11	+12	8	Quarterfinals
3	Sweden	5	3	0	2	15	12	+3	6	Quarterfinals
4	United States	5	1	1	3	13	13	0	3	Quarterfinals
5	Kazakhstan	5	1	0	4	9	16	−7	2	
6	Latvia	5	0	1	4	11	29	−18	1	

Source: IIHF

15 February 2006; 20:05	Russia	3–5 (2–1, 1–2, 0–2)	Slovakia	Torino Esposizioni, Turin; Attendance: 3,800

Game reference

Ilya Bryzgalov
Goalies
Peter Budaj
Referee:
(Canada) Paul Devorski
Linesmen:
(Canada) Derek Doucette
(Finland) Antti Hämäläinen

	0–1	9:07 – P. Demitra (Mari. Hossa, R. Suchý)
P. Datsyuk (D. Markov) – 10:00	1–1
A. Kovalev (P. Datsyuk, I. Kovalchuk) – 12:38	2–1
	2–2	25:51 – L. Višňovský (P. Demitra) (PP)
A. Ovechkin (S. Gonchar, F. Tyutin) (PP) – 30:03	3–2
	3–3	33:05 – P. Bondra (A. Meszároš, Z. Chára) (PP)
	3–4	56:32 – M. Gáborík
	3–5	59:31 – M. Gáborík

16 min
Penalties
10 min
23
Shots
36

16 February 2006; 16:05	Sweden	0–5 (0–0, 0–3, 0–2)	Russia	Palasport Olimpico, Turin; Attendance: 8,545

Game reference

Henrik Lundqvist
Goalies
Evgeni Nabokov
Referee:
(Canada) Don Van Massenhoven
Linesmen:
(Czech Republic) Petr Blümel
(Canada) Steve Miller

0–1	27:13 – A. Kovalev (A. Markov) (PP)
0–2	28:05 – A. Ovechkin (A. Yashin)
0–3	38:58 – M. Sushinsky (E. Malkin, S. Zhukov)
0–4	50:31 – V. Kozlov (A. Frolov, A. Korolyuk)
0–5	54:04 – M. Afinogenov (P. Datsyuk)

20 min
Penalties
16 min
24
Shots
32

18 February 2006; 11:35	Kazakhstan	0–1 (0–0, 0–1, 0–0)	Russia	Torino Esposizioni, Turin; Attendance: 3,660

Game reference
Vitali Yeremeyev	Goalies	Evgeni Nabokov	Referee: (Sweden) Christer Lärking; Linesmen: (Finland) Stefan Fonselius (Germany) Thomas Gemeinhardt
0–1 / 31:38 – A. Kharitonov (M. Sushinsky, E. Malkin)			Referee: (Sweden) Christer Lärking; Linesmen: (Finland) Stefan Fonselius (Germany) Thomas Gemeinhardt
26 min	Penalties	12 min	Referee: (Sweden) Christer Lärking; Linesmen: (Finland) Stefan Fonselius (Germany) Thomas Gemeinhardt
24	Shots	50	Referee: (Sweden) Christer Lärking; Linesmen: (Finland) Stefan Fonselius (Germany) Thomas Gemeinhardt

19 February 2006; 13:05	Russia	9–2 (3–1, 3–0, 3–1)	Latvia	Torino Esposizioni, Turin; Attendance: 4,310

Game reference

Evgeni Nabokov (out 40:00)
Maxim Sokolov (in 40:00)
Goalies
Artūrs Irbe (out 27:58)
Edgars Masaļskis (in 27:58)
Referee:
(United States) Dennis LaRue
Linesmen:
(Czech Republic) Petr Blümel
(Finland) Stefan Fonselius

I. Kovalchuk (A. Kovalev, D. Markov) – 7:26	1–0
M. Sushinsky (A. Kharitonov, S. Gonchar) (PP2) – 9:15	2–0
	2–1	9:55 – A. Cipruss (SH)
I. Kovalchuk (P. Datsyuk) – 12:36	3–1
I. Kovalchuk (A. Kovalev, P. Datsyuk) – 23:32	4–1
V. Kozlov (A. Yashin) – 25:45	5–1
I. Kovalchuk (P. Datsyuk) – 35:16	6–1
A. Yashin (V. Kozlov, S. Zhukov) – 41:58	7–1
E. Malkin (M. Sushinsky, V. Vishnevski) – 47:32	8–1
A. Ovechkin (V. Kozlov, A. Yashin) – 56:27	9–1
	9–2	58:04 – M. Rēdlihs (A. Bērziņš)

16 min
Penalties
18 min
39
Shots
11

21 February 2006; 20:35	United States	4–5 (1–2, 1–1, 2–2)	Russia	Palasport Olimpico, Turin; Attendance: 9,378

Game reference

Robert Esche
Goalies
Evgeni Nabokov (out 20:00)
Maxim Sokolov (in 20:00)
Referee:
(Canada) Paul Devorski
Linesmen:
(Finland) Stefan Fonselius
(Canada) Steve Miller

	0–1	9:27 – A. Korolyuk
	0–2	10:41 – E. Malkin (D. Kasparaitis) (SH)
B. Rolston (C. Conroy) (PP) – 18:38	1–2
	1–3	35:00 – A. Markov (P. Datsyuk, M. Sushinsky)
B. Gionta (S. Gomez, D. Weight) (PP) – 39:01	2–3
S. Gomez (M. Schneider, B. Rolston) (PP) – 45:00	3–3
	3–4	49:55 – A. Ovechkin (E. Malkin, D. Kasparaitis)
E. Cole (M. Knuble, C. Drury) – 50:38	4–4
	4–5	51:52 – A. Kovalev (P. Datsyuk, E. Malkin)

8 min
Penalties
14 min
34
Shots
21

Medal round

Quarterfinal

22 February 2006; 20:35	Russia	2–0 (0–0, 0–0, 2–0)	Canada	Torino Esposizioni, Turin; Attendance: 4,130

Game reference
Evgeni Nabokov	Goalies	Martin Brodeur	Referee: (United States) Dennis LaRue; Linesmen: (Sweden) Joacim Karlsson (United States) Tony Sericolo
A. Ovechkin (V. Kozlov) (PP) – 41:30 / 1–0; A. Kovalev (A. Markov) (PP) – 59:37 / 2–0			Referee: (United States) Dennis LaRue; Linesmen: (Sweden) Joacim Karlsson (United States) Tony Sericolo
41 min	Penalties	18 min	Referee: (United States) Dennis LaRue; Linesmen: (Sweden) Joacim Karlsson (United States) Tony Sericolo
33	Shots	27	Referee: (United States) Dennis LaRue; Linesmen: (Sweden) Joacim Karlsson (United States) Tony Sericolo

Semifinal

24 February 2006; 21:05	Finland	4–0 (1–0, 2–0, 1–0)	Russia	Palasport Olimpico, Turin; Attendance: 8,702

Game reference

Antero Niittymäki
Goalies
Evgeni Nabokov
Referee:
(Canada) Don Van Massenhoven
Linesmen:
(Slovakia) Milan Mášik
(United States) Tony Sericolo

V. Peltonen (K. Timonen) (PP) – 6:13	1–0
T. Lydman (S. Koivu) – 29:33	2–0
S. Koivu (K. Timonen, T. Selänne) (PP) – 33:51	3–0
O. Jokinen (V. Peltonen, N. Kapanen) – 49:17	4–0

8 min
Penalties
16 min
30
Shots
21

Bronze game

25 February 2006; 20:35	Russia	0–3 (0–1, 0–1, 0–1)	Czech Republic	Palasport Olimpico, Turin; Attendance: 8,379

Game reference

Evgeni Nabokov
Goalies
Tomáš Vokoun
Referee:
(Sweden) Thomas Andersson
Linesmen:
(Sweden) Joacim Karlsson
(Canada) Steve Miller

0–1	4:48 – M. Erat (D. Výborný, R. Lang)
0–2	26:36 – M. Židlický (J. Jágr, R. Lang) (PP)
0–3	59:52 – M. Straka (M. Erat) (EN)

41 min
Penalties
14 min
28
Shots
15

=== Women's tournament ===
The Russian women's team lost to both Canada and Sweden, and failed to progress to the medal round. In the 5th place game, the team lost on a shootout to Germany.

Players

The following is the Russian roster in the women's ice hockey tournament of the 2006 Winter Olympics.

Head coach: (Russia) Alexey Kalintsev Assistant coach: (Russia) Alexey Zherebtsov

No.	Pos.	Name	Height	Weight	Birthdate	Birthplace	2005–06 team
33	G	Nadezhda Aleksandrova	1.72 m (5 ft 8 in)	67 kg (148 lb)	3 January 1986	Moscow, Soviet Union	(Russia) SKIF Moscow
2	D	Maria Barykina	1.70 m (5 ft 7 in)	60 kg (130 lb)	9 December 1973	Moscow, Soviet Union	(Russia) Tornado Dmitrov
23	F	Tatiana Burina	1.63 m (5 ft 4 in)	65 kg (143 lb)	20 March 1980	Novosibirsk, Soviet Union	(Russia) Tornado Dmitrov
27	D	Elena Byalkovskaya	1.79 m (5 ft 10 in)	82 kg (181 lb)	22 March 1977	Moscow, Soviet Union	(Russia) SKIF Moscow
20	G	Irina Gashennikova	1.60 m (5 ft 3 in)	66 kg (146 lb)	11 May 1975	Pushkino, Soviet Union	(Russia) SKIF Moscow
24	F	Iya Gavrilova	1.73 m (5 ft 8 in)	61 kg (134 lb)	3 September 1987	Krasnoyarsk, Soviet Union	(Russia) SKIF Moscow
12	F	Yulia Gladysheva	1.66 m (5 ft 5 in)	56 kg (123 lb)	4 December 1981	Moscow, Soviet Union	(Russia) SKIF Moscow
16	D	Alexandra Kapustina	1.65 m (5 ft 5 in)	71 kg (157 lb)	7 April 1984	Pervouralsk, Soviet Union	(Russia) Spartak-Merkury Yekaterinburg
4	D	Alena Khomich	1.68 m (5 ft 6 in)	56 kg (123 lb)	26 February 1981	Pervouralsk, Soviet Union	(Russia) Spartak-Merkury Yekaterinburg
10	F	Larisa Mishina	1.68 m (5 ft 6 in)	80 kg (180 lb)	10 September 1975	Moscow, Soviet Union	(Russia) SKIF Moscow
25	F	Ekaterina Pashkevich – A	1.80 m (5 ft 11 in)	80 kg (180 lb)	19 September 1972	Moscow, Soviet Union	(Russia) Tornado Dmitrov
15	D	Olga Permyakova	1.68 m (5 ft 6 in)	66 kg (146 lb)	12 April 1982	Chelyabinsk, Soviet Union	(Russia) Tornado Dmitrov
14	D	Kristina Petrovskaya	1.68 m (5 ft 6 in)	63 kg (139 lb)	3 June 1980	Moscow, Soviet Union	(Russia) Tornado Dmitrov
29	D	Zhanna Schelchkova – C	1.64 m (5 ft 5 in)	60 kg (130 lb)	10 February 1969	Moscow, Soviet Union	(Russia) SKIF Moscow
5	F	Galina Skiba	1.60 m (5 ft 3 in)	65 kg (143 lb)	9 May 1984	Kharkiv, Ukrainian SSR, Soviet Union	(Russia) SKIF Moscow
17	F	Ekaterina Smolentseva – A	1.70 m (5 ft 7 in)	65 kg (143 lb)	15 September 1981	Pervouralsk, Soviet Union	(Russia) Tornado Dmitrov
7	F	Ekaterina Smolina	1.58 m (5 ft 2 in)	55 kg (121 lb)	8 October 1988	Ust-Kamenogorsk, Kazakh SSR, Soviet Union	(Russia) SKIF Moscow
11	F	Tatiana Sotnikova	1.66 m (5 ft 5 in)	58 kg (128 lb)	20 January 1981	Moscow, Soviet Union	(Russia) SKIF Moscow
21	F	Svetlana Trefilova	1.65 m (5 ft 5 in)	60 kg (130 lb)	20 May 1973	Sverdlovsk, Soviet Union	(Russia) Tornado Dmitrov
28	F	Oxana Tretiyakova	1.64 m (5 ft 5 in)	75 kg (165 lb)	10 March 1979	Krasnoyarsk, Soviet Union	(Russia) SKIF Moscow

Round-robin

Pos	Team	Pld	W	D	L	GF	GA	GD	Pts	Qualification
1	Canada	3	3	0	0	36	1	+35	6	Semifinals
2	Sweden	3	2	0	1	15	9	+6	4	Semifinals
3	Russia	3	1	0	2	6	16	−10	2	5–8th place semifinals
4	Italy (H)	3	0	0	3	1	32	−31	0	5–8th place semifinals

(H) Hosts

11 February 2006; 15:35	Sweden	3–1 (0–0, 2–1, 1–0)	Russia	Palasport Olimpico, Turin; Attendance: 6,500

Game reference

Kim Martin
Goalies
Irina Gashennikova
Referee:
(Canada) Stephanie Normand
Linesmen:
(Germany) Michaela Kiefer
(United States) Julie Piacentini

Jansson (Lindberg, Winberg) (PP) – 23:26	1–0
Timglas (Rooth, O'Konor) (PP) – 25:14	2–0
	2–1	39:21 – Trefilova
Rooth (G. Andersson) (PP) – 40:32	3–1

14 min
Penalties
14 min
24
Shots
31

12 February 2006; 16:35	Russia	0–12 (0–7, 0–2, 0–3)	Canada	Torino Esposizioni, Turin; Attendance: 2,414

Game reference

Irina Gashennikova
Nadezhda Alexandrova
Goalies
Charline Labonte
Referee:
(United Kingdom) Joy Tottman
Linesmen:
(Finland) Johanna Suban
(Czech Republic) Jana Zítková

0–1	04:53 – Sunohara (Ouellette, Goyette)
0–2	06:52 – Agosta (Kinsbury, Weatherston)
0–3	10:00 – Piper (Apps) (SH)
0–4	15:14 – Goyette (Campbell)
0–5	16:18 – Piper (Wickenheiser)
0–6	17:48 – Wickenheiser (SH)
0–7	19:20 – Agosta (Vaillancourt)
0–8	27:19 – Weatherston (Ouellette, Vaillancourt)
0–9	33:27 – Agosta (PP)
0–10	41:16 – Piper (Wickenheiser)
0–11	47:47 – Vaillancourt (Hefford, Botterill)
0–12	52:33 – MacLeod (Wickenheiser)

28 min
Penalties
14 min
17
Shots
43

14 February 2006; 13:05	Italy	1–5 (1–1, 0–1, 0–3)	Russia	Torino Esposizioni, Turin; Attendance: 2,046

Debora Montanari
Goalies
Irina Gashennikova
Referee:
(Germany) Bianca Walter
Linesmen:
(France) Anne-Sophie Boniface
(Germany) Michaela Kiefer

Florian (Leitner, Bettarini) (PP2) – 8:02	1–0
	1–1	11:17 – Gladysheva (PP)
	1–2	25:51 – Trefilova (Pashkevich) (PP)
	1–3	44:31 – Gavrilova (Khomich) (PP)
	1–4	46:53 – Gavrilova (Sotnikova)
	1–5	53:04 – Trefilova (Shchelchkova) (PP)

26 min
Penalties
18 min
13
Shots
40

Classification games

5th-8th classification

17 February 2006; 13:05	Russia	6–2 (1–1, 4–1, 1–0)	Switzerland	Torino Esposizioni, Turin; Attendance: 2,800

Game reference

Irina Gashennikova
Goalies
Patricia Elsmore-Sautter
Florence Schelling
Referee:
(Czech Republic) Kateřina Ivičičová
Linesmen:
(France) Anne-Sophie Boniface
(Sweden) Annica Flödén

Trefilova – 02:03	1–0
	1–1	10:52 – Rochat
Burina (Mishina, Barykina) – 25:14	2–1
Mishina (Smolentseva) – 26:19	3–1
Mishina (Byalkovskaya) (PP) – 30:00	4–1
	4–2	31:55 – Lehmann (Cattaneo, Bullo)
Mishina (Smolentseva) – 39:18	5–2
Kapustina (Shchelchkova) (PP) – 52:17	6–2

16 min
Penalties
12 min
36
Shots
18

5th place game

20 February 2006; 13:05	Germany	1–0 GWS (0–0, 0–0, 0–0) (OT: 0–0) (SO: 1–0)	Russia	Torino Esposizioni, Turin; Attendance: 2,570

Game reference
Jennifer Harß	Goalies	Irina Gashennikova	Referee: (United States) Danyel Howard; Linesmen: (United States) Julie Piacentini (Netherlands) Ilse Robben
Oswald (miss); M. Lanzl (miss); Scheytt (miss); Becker; Holmes	Shootout	(miss) Pashkevich; (miss) Smolentseva; (miss) Smolina; (miss) Kapustina	Referee: (United States) Danyel Howard; Linesmen: (United States) Julie Piacentini (Netherlands) Ilse Robben
4 min	Penalties	14 min	Referee: (United States) Danyel Howard; Linesmen: (United States) Julie Piacentini (Netherlands) Ilse Robben
26	Shots	21	Referee: (United States) Danyel Howard; Linesmen: (United States) Julie Piacentini (Netherlands) Ilse Robben

== Luge ==
Athlete	Event	Final					
Athlete	Event	Run 1	Run 2	Run 3	Run 4	Total	Rank
Yuliya Anashkina	Women's singles	47.952	48.190	48.059	48.208	3:12.409	16
Albert Demtschenko	Men's singles	51.747	51.543	51.396	51.512	3:26.198	Silver medal
Viktor Kneib	Men's singles	52.050	52.150	51.981	51.884	3:28.065	11
Alexandra Rodionova	Women's singles	48.165	47.935	48.186	47.881	3:12.167	14
Kiril Serikov	Men's singles	54.164	52.468	52.473	52.790	3:31.895	24
Anastasiya Skulkina	Women's singles	49.174	48.089	50.033	48.072	3:15.368	21
Vladimir Boitsov; Dmitriy Khamkin	Doubles	did not finish					
Mikhail Kuzmich; Jury Veselov	Doubles	47.556	48.094	n/a		1:35.650	11

== Nordic combined ==
Athlete	Event	Ski jumping		Cross-country		
Athlete	Event	Points	Rank	Deficit	Time	Rank
Aleksei Barannikov	Sprint	83.5	46	2:49	21:38.2 +3:09.2	42
Aleksei Barannikov	Individual Gundersen	194.0	37	4:34	44:20.3 +3:09.2	29
Ivan Fesenko	Sprint	112.2	11	0:54	20:30.6 +2:01.6	33
Ivan Fesenko	Individual Gundersen	215.0	25	3:10	44:01.3 +4:16.7	28
Sergei Maslennikov	Sprint	99.3	32	1:46	21:42.1 +3:13.1	43
Sergei Maslennikov	Individual Gundersen	251.0	5	0:46	41:30.2 +1:45.6	10
Dmitri Matveev	Sprint	106.8	20	1:16	20:37.1 +2:08.1	35
Dmitri Matveev	Individual Gundersen	did not finish				
Ivan Fesenko; Anton Kamenev; Sergei Maslennikov; Dmitri Matveev	Team	890.1	3	0:23	54:05.1 +4:12.5	9

Note: 'Deficit' refers to the amount of time behind the leader a competitor began the cross-country portion of the event. Italicized numbers show the final deficit from the winner's finishing time.

== Short track speed skating ==
Athlete	Event	Heat		Quarterfinal		Semifinal		Final	
Athlete	Event	Time	Rank	Time	Rank	Time	Rank	Time	Rank
Tatiana Borodulina	Women's 1000 m	1:34.988	2 Q	disqualified					
Tatiana Borodulina	Women's 1500 m	2:27.757	3 Q	n/a		2:45.897	5	disqualified	
Vyacheslav Kurginyan	Men's 500 m	43.183	3	did not advance					14
Vyacheslav Kurginyan	Men's 1000 m	1:36.070	3	did not advance					18
Vyacheslav Kurginyan	Men's 1500 m	2:33.802	3 Q	n/a		2:24.604	6	did not advance	15
Mikhail Rajine	Men's 500 m	44.077	3	did not advance					18
Mikhail Rajine	Men's 1000 m	1:42.677	3 ADV	1:32.432	4	did not advance			13
Mikhail Rajine	Men's 1500 m	2:33.809	5	did not advance					23

Key: 'ADV' indicates a skater was advanced due to being interfered with.

== Skeleton ==
Athlete	Event	Final			
Athlete	Event	Run 1	Run 2	Total	Rank
Aleksandr Tretyakov	Men's	59.71	59.32	1:59.03	15
Svetlana Trunova	Women's	1:01.23	1:01.83	2:03.06	11

== Ski jumping ==
Athlete	Event	Qualifying		First round		Final		
Athlete	Event	Points	Rank	Points	Rank	Points	Total	Rank
Ildar Fatchullin	Normal hill	119.0	13 Q	102.5	44	did not advance		44
Ildar Fatchullin	Large hill	85.4	23 Q	82.6	41	did not advance		41
Dmitry Ipatov	Normal hill	129.0	2 Q	121.5	19 Q	121.0	242.5	19
Dmitry Ipatov	Large hill	98.1	9 Q	99.9	22 Q	97.2	197.1	27
Denis Kornilov	Normal hill	117.0	16 Q	110.0	34	did not advance		34
Denis Kornilov	Large hill	95.9	11 Q	94.0	33	did not advance		33
Dmitry Vassiliev	Normal hill	128.5	3 Q	135.0	1 Q	123.5	258.5	10
Dmitry Vassiliev	Large hill	111.3	5 Q	99.4	24 Q	114.8	214.2	17
Ildar Fatchullin; Dmitry Ipatov; Denis Kornilov; Dmitry Vassiliev	Team	n/a		425.0	7 Q	431.8	856.8	8

== Snowboarding ==
Halfpipe

Athlete	Event	Qualifying run 1		Qualifying run 2		Final		
Athlete	Event	Points	Rank	Points	Rank	Run 1	Run 2	Rank
Yuri Podladtchikov	Men's halfpipe	1.0	44	13.6	31	did not advance		37
Maria Prusakova	Women's halfpipe	8.5	30	8.2	26	did not advance		32
Svetlana Vinogradova	Women's halfpipe	6.9	33	13.8	23	did not advance		29

Note: In the final, the single best score from two runs is used to determine the ranking. A bracketed score indicates a run that wasn't counted.

Parallel GS

Athlete	Event	Qualification		Round of 16	Quarterfinals	Semifinals	Finals	
Athlete	Event	Time	Rank	Opposition Time	Opposition Time	Opposition Time	Opposition Time	Rank
Aleksandr Belkin	Men's parallel giant slalom	1:14.04	25	did not advance				25
Svetlana Boldikova	Women's parallel giant slalom	1:21.32	4 Q	Dal Balcon (ITA) (13); W -18.13 (+0.32 -18.45)	Kober (GER) (5); L +0.07 (+0.22 -0.15)	Classification 5–8; Tudegesheva (RUS) (1); L +3.69 (+1.50 +2.19)	7th place final Bruhin (SUI) (7); L +1.74 (+0.71 +1.03)	8
Olga Golovanova	Women's parallel giant slalom	1:23.59	21	did not advance				21
Denis Salagaev	Men's parallel giant slalom	1:12.32	18	did not advance				18
Ekaterina Tudegesheva	Women's parallel giant slalom	1:20.85	1 Q	Hagglof (SWE) (16); W -1.13 (-0.34 -0.79)	Guenther (AUT) (8); L +0.66 (+0.97 -0.31)	Classification 5–8; Boldikova (RUS) (4); W -3.69 (-1.50 -2.19)	5th place final Pomagalski (SUI) (7); W -1.04 (-1.32 +0.28)	5

Key: '+ Time' represents a deficit; the brackets indicate the results of each run.

== Speed skating ==
Men

Athlete	Event	Race 1		Final	
Athlete	Event	Time	Rank	Time	Rank
Artyom Detyshev	5000 m	n/a		6:32.85	15
Artyom Detyshev	10000 m	disqualified			
Dmitry Dorofeyev	500 m	35.24	35.17	1:10.41	Silver medal
Dmitry Dorofeyev	1000 m	n/a		1:09.74	10
Aleksandr Kibalko	1000 m	n/a		1:10.50	21
Aleksandr Kibalko	1500 m	n/a		1:50.29	32
Yury Kokhanets	5000 m	n/a		6:34.62	17
Sergey Kornilov	500 m	36.00	36.24	1:12.24	27
Yevgeny Lalenkov	1000 m	n/a		1:09.46	7
Yevgeny Lalenkov	1500 m	n/a		1:49.00	23
Dmitry Lobkov	500 m	35.55	35.62	1:11.17	14
Alexey Proshin	500 m	35.96	35.94	1:11.90	24
Alexey Proshin	1000 m	n/a		1:10.14	15
Dmitry Shepel	1500 m	n/a		1:48.74	21
Ivan Skobrev	1500 m	n/a		1:46.91	6
Ivan Skobrev	5000 m	n/a		6:27.02	11
Ivan Skobrev	10000 m	n/a		13:17.54	6

Women

Athlete	Event	Race 1		Final	
Athlete	Event	Time	Rank	Time	Rank
Yekaterina Abramova	1000 m	n/a		1:17.33	9
Yekaterina Abramova	1500 m	n/a		2:01.63	21
Varvara Barysheva	1000 m	n/a		1:17.52	11
Varvara Barysheva	1500 m	n/a		2:01.60	20
Yekaterina Lobysheva	1000 m	n/a		1:17.52	11
Yekaterina Lobysheva	1500 m	n/a		1:58.87	6
Yulia Nemaya	500 m	39.63	1:12.76	1:52.39	29
Svetlana Vysokova	3000 m	n/a		4:13.94	18
Valentina Yakshina	1500 m	n/a		2:02.15	25
Valentina Yakshina	3000 m	n/a		4:19.43	24
Svetlana Zhurova	500 m	38.23	38.34	1:16.57	Gold medal
Svetlana Zhurova	1000 m	n/a		1:17.13	7

Team pursuit

Athlete	Event	Seeding		Quarterfinal	Semifinal	Final	
Athlete	Event	Time	Rank	Opposition Time	Opposition Time	Opposition Time	Rank
From: Artyom Detyshev; Aleksandr Kibalko; Yevgeny Lalenkov; Dmitry Shepel; Ivan Skobrev	Men's team pursuit	3:49.75	6	Netherlands (3); L Overtaken	did not advance	5th place final United States (7); W 3:46.91	5
From: Yekaterina Abramova; Varvara Barysheva; Galina Likhachova; Yekaterina Lobysheva; Svetlana Vysokova	Women's team pursuit	3:03.19	1	China (8); W Overtook	Germany (5); L 3:07.42	Bronze final Japan (7); W Overtook	Bronze medal
