= 2001 World Ice Hockey Championships =

2001 World Ice Hockey Championships may refer to:

- 2001 Men's World Ice Hockey Championships
- 2001 Women's World Ice Hockey Championships
- 2001 World Junior Ice Hockey Championships
- 2001 IIHF World U18 Championships
