= Jim Fahey =

American ice hockey player (born 1979)

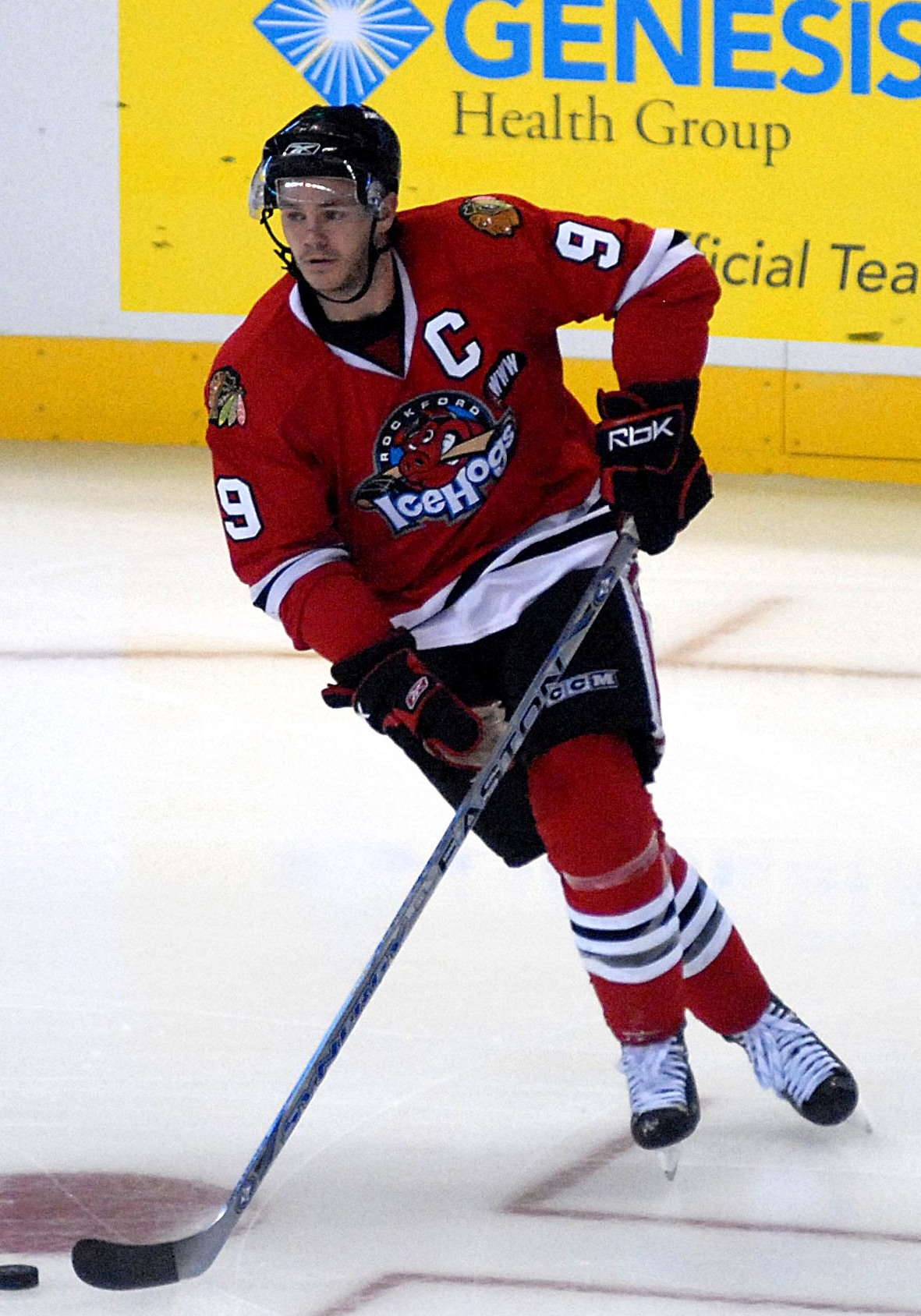
- Fahey with the Rockford IceHogs in 2007
- Born: May 11, 1979 (age 47) Boston, Massachusetts, U.S.
- Height: 6 ft 0 in (183 cm)
- Weight: 205 lb (93 kg; 14 st 9 lb)
- Position: Defense
- Shot: Right
- Played for: San Jose Sharks; New Jersey Devils; Krefeld Pinguine
- National team: United States
- NHL draft: 212th overall, 1998; San Jose Sharks
- Playing career: 2002–2010

James M. Fahey (born May 11, 1979) is an American former professional ice hockey defenseman who played in the National Hockey League (NHL) with the San Jose Sharks and the New Jersey Devils. He last played for the Krefeld Pinguine of the DEL.

== Playing career ==
Fahey was drafted in the 8th round, 212th overall, by the San Jose Sharks in the 1998 NHL entry draft. Before becoming a professional hockey player, Jim was a member of the Dorchester, MA (Greater Boston Youth Hockey League), Tier 2 National Championship Midget Team in 1996, and subsequently a standout at Catholic Memorial High School. He went on to become a star at Northeastern University, where he finished his career with the single-season defense scoring record for the Huskies as a First Team All-American and Hobey Baker Award finalist. During his draft year, he was featured in a segment with his idol, Raymond Bourque, in a feature for NHL on Fox.

Following his college career, in the 2003 season, after spending some time with San Jose's AHL farm team in Cleveland, Fahey was recalled to the Sharks and was selected San Jose's rookie of the year. Despite spending nearly half the season in the minor leagues, he led all rookie NHL defensemen in scoring.

In the 2004 season, Fahey battled pneumonia, and after recording only two points in fifteen games, was sent down to Cleveland, where he played for the remainder of that season, and saw only sporadic NHL duty thereafter.

Fahey has also played in international competitions, like the 2003 IIHF Men's World Championships. He has been named to the PlanetUSA AHL All-Star team.

Fahey re-signed on a one-year contract worth US$500,000 on July 15, 2006. Prior to the 2006–07 NHL season, Fahey was traded with Alexander Korolyuk to the New Jersey Devils for Vladimir Malakhov and a conditional first-round pick.

On July 27, 2007, Fahey signed with the Chicago Blackhawks and spent the full year with the Rockford IceHogs of the AHL. On March 26, 2008, Fahey signed with the German team Krefeld Pinguine of the DEL.

On July 6, 2010, after two seasons with Krefeld, Fahey signed a one-year contract with rival DEL team Thomas Sabo Ice Tigers. However, only three weeks later on July 24, Fahey terminated his agreement with the Ice Tigers for personal reasons and remained in the US.

== Career statistics ==
=== Regular season and playoffs ===
			Regular season					Playoffs
Season	Team	League	GP	G	A	Pts	PIM	GP	G	A	Pts	PIM
1998–99	Northeastern University	HE	32	5	13	18	34	—	—	—	—	—
1999–00	Northeastern University	HE	36	3	17	20	62	—	—	—	—	—
2000–01	Northeastern University	HE	36	4	23	27	48	—	—	—	—	—
2001–02	Northeastern University	HE	39	14	32	46	50	—	—	—	—	—
2002–03	Cleveland Barons	AHL	25	3	14	17	42	—	—	—	—	—
2002–03	San Jose Sharks	NHL	43	1	19	20	33	—	—	—	—	—
2003–04	Cleveland Barons	AHL	32	1	18	19	64	—	—	—	—	—
2003–04	San Jose Sharks	NHL	15	0	2	2	18	2	0	0	0	0
2004–05	Cleveland Barons	AHL	69	4	22	26	146	—	—	—	—	—
2005–06	San Jose Sharks	NHL	21	0	2	2	14	—	—	—	—	—
2006–07	New Jersey Devils	NHL	13	0	1	1	2	—	—	—	—	—
2006–07	Lowell Devils	AHL	28	0	9	9	37	—	—	—	—	—
2007–08	Rockford IceHogs	AHL	65	0	12	12	109	12	1	3	4	18
2008–09	Krefeld Pinguine	DEL	47	5	16	21	83	7	1	1	2	6
2009–10	Krefeld Pinguine	DEL	50	4	20	24	38	—	—	—	—	—
NHL totals			92	1	24	25	67	2	0	0	0	0

=== International ===
Year	Team	Event	Result	GP	G	A	Pts	PIM
2003	United States	WC	13th	6	1	0	1	2
Senior totals				6	1	0	1	2

== Awards and honors ==
Award	Year
College
All-Hockey East Rookie Team	1998–99
All-Hockey East Second Team	2000–01
All-Hockey East First Team	2001–02
AHCA East First-Team All-American	2001–02
Hobey Baker Memorial Award finalist	2001–02
