= Sergey Zhukov (ice hockey) =

Russian ice hockey player (born 1975)

Sergei Zhukov
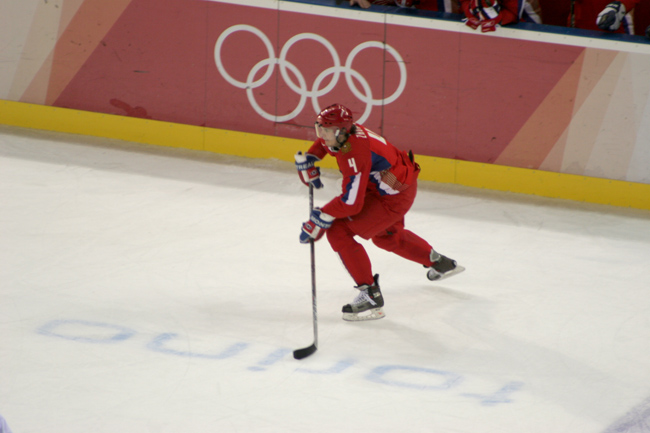
- Born: 23 November 1975 (age 49); Novosibirsk, Russian SFSR, Soviet Union
- Height: 6 ft 4 in (193 cm)
- Weight: 194 lb (88 kg; 13 st 12 lb)
- Position: Defence
- Shot: Left
- KHL team Former teams: Lokomotiv Yaroslavl; HC Sibir Novosibirsk
- National team: Russia
- NHL draft: 203rd overall, 1995; Boston Bruins
- Playing career: 1994–2011

Sergei Petrovich Zhukov (born 23 November 1975) is a Russian former professional ice hockey player who last played for Lokomotiv Yaroslavl of the Kontinental Hockey League (KHL).

== Career statistics ==
=== Regular season and playoffs ===
			Regular season					Playoffs
Season	Team	League	GP	G	A	Pts	PIM	GP	G	A	Pts	PIM
1991–92	Sibir Novosibirsk	CIS.2	7	0	0	0	2	—	—	—	—	—
1992–93	Sibir Novosibirsk	RUS.2	8	0	0	0	6	—	—	—	—	—
1992–93	Yarinterkom Yaroslavl	RUS.2	3	0	0	0	0	—	—	—	—	—
1993–94	Torpedo–2 Yaroslavl	RUS.3	54	0	5	5	24	—	—	—	—	—
1994–95	Torpedo Yaroslavl	IHL	27	1	0	1	4	4	0	0	0	0
1994–95	Torpedo–2 Yaroslavl	RUS.2	19	0	2	2	6	—	—	—	—	—
1995–96	Torpedo Yaroslavl	IHL	52	0	2	2	30	3	0	0	0	0
1996–97	Torpedo Yaroslavl	RSL	44	0	6	6	34	9	0	0	0	4
1997–98	Torpedo Yaroslavl	RSL	45	2	6	8	26	6	1	0	1	4
1998–99	Torpedo Yaroslavl	RSL	40	1	2	3	18	14	2	2	4	4
1998–99	Torpedo–2 Yaroslavl	RUS.2	3	0	1	1	2	—	—	—	—	—
1999–2000	Torpedo Yaroslavl	RSL	36	1	4	5	14	9	0	0	0	4
1999–2000	Torpedo–2 Yaroslavl	RUS.3	1	0	0	0	0	—	—	—	—	—
2000–01	Lokomotiv Yaroslavl	RSL	44	1	4	5	18	11	0	0	0	6
2001–02	Lokomotiv Yaroslavl	RSL	50	2	7	9	20	9	1	4	5	2
2002–03	Lokomotiv Yaroslavl	RSL	50	0	9	9	18	10	0	1	1	2
2003–04	Lokomotiv Yaroslavl	RSL	52	0	5	5	14	3	0	0	0	0
2004–05	Lokomotiv Yaroslavl	RSL	54	3	1	4	22	9	0	0	0	6
2004–05	Lokomotiv–2 Yaroslavl	RUS.3	1	0	0	0	0	—	—	—	—	—
2005–06	Lokomotiv Yaroslavl	RSL	51	1	7	8	42	11	1	2	3	0
2006–07	Lokomotiv Yaroslavl	RSL	54	2	6	8	24	7	0	0	0	4
2007–08	Lokomotiv Yaroslavl	RSL	46	1	2	3	18	16	0	2	2	4
2008–09	Lokomotiv Yaroslavl	KHL	55	1	1	2	26	19	0	0	0	10
2009–10	Lokomotiv Yaroslavl	KHL	56	3	1	4	18	17	0	1	1	2
2010–11	Lokomotiv Yaroslavl	KHL	37	0	5	5	16	18	0	1	1	4
RSL totals			566	14	59	73	268	114	5	11	16	40
KHL totals			148	4	7	11	60	54	0	2	2	16

=== International ===
Year	Team	Event	GP	G	A	Pts	PIM
1998	Russia	WC	6	0	0	0	2
2001	Russia	WC	7	0	1	1	0
2002	Russia	WC	9	1	2	3	0
2006	Russia	OG	8	0	2	2	6
2006	Russia	WC	7	0	1	1	8
Senior totals			37	1	6	7	16
