= Yelena Bobrova =

Russian ice hockey player

Yelena Bobrova Елена Боброва
- Born: 23 August 1974 (age 52) Krasnoyarsk, Russian SFSR, Soviet Union
- Height: 172 cm (5 ft 8 in)
- Weight: 64 kg (141 lb; 10 st 1 lb)
- Position: Defense
- Shot: Left
- Played for: HC Tornado; SKIF Moscow
- National team: Russia
- Playing career: c. 1995–2007
Medal record
World Championship
Bronze medal – third place	2001 United States

Yelena Borisovna Bobrova née Rodikova (Russian: Елена Борисовна Боброва (Родикова); born 23 August 1974) is a Russian retired ice hockey player. As a member of the Russian national team, she competed in the women's ice hockey tournament at the 2002 Winter Olympics in Salt Lake City and at the IIHF Women's World Championship in 1997, 2001, and 2007; she was the reserve skater for the Russian team at the 1999 IIHF Women's World Championship.
