= Olga Savenkova =

Russian ice hockey player

Olga Savenkova Ольга Савенкова
- Born: 2 July 1982 (age 44) Krasnoyarsk, Russian SSR, Soviet Union
- Height: 180 cm (5 ft 11 in)
- Weight: 66 kg (146 lb; 10 st 6 lb)
- Position: Defence
- Shot: Left
- Played for: SKIF Moscow; Lokomotiv Krasnoyarsk
- National team: Russia
- Playing career: c. 1996–2005
Medal record
Women's ice hockey
Representing Russia
World Championships
Bronze medal – third place	2001 United States

Olga Volkova née Savenkova (Russian: Ольга Волкова née Савенкова; born 2 July 1982) is a Russian retired ice hockey player. She represented Russia in the women's ice hockey tournament at the 2002 Winter Olympics, at the IIHF Women's World Championships in 1999, 2000, 2004, and 2005, and won bronze at the 2001 IIHF Women's World Championship.
