= Tatyana Tsaryova =

Russian ice hockey player

Tatyana Tsaryova Татьяна Царёва
- Born: 30 December 1977 (age 48) Saratov Oblast, Russian SFSR, Soviet Union
- Height: 164 cm (5 ft 5 in)
- Weight: 59 kg (130 lb; 9 st 4 lb)
- Position: Right wing
- Shot: Left
- Played for: Luzhniki Moscow; CSK VVS Moscow; Porin Ässät; Viking Moscow; Tornado Dmitrov; Agidel Ufa
- Playing career: 1995–2013
Medal record
World Championship
Bronze medal – third place	2001 United States
European Championship
Silver medal – second place	1996 Russia

Tatyana Tsaryova MS (Russian: Татьяна Царёва, also romanized as Tatiana Tsareva; born 30 December 1977) is a Soviet-born Russian retired ice hockey player, a right winger. She represented Russia in the women's ice hockey tournament at the 2002 Winter Olympics in Salt Lake City and at the IIHF Women's World Championship in 1997, 1999, 2000, and 2001, winning a bronze medal at the 2001 tournament.

== Playing career ==
Tsaryova's senior career began with Luzhniki Moscow in the inaugural season of the Russian Women's Hockey League (RWHL), 1995–96. She remained with the team as it was renamed CSK VVS Moscow in 1996 and Viking Moscow in 1998.

During the 1999–2000 season, she played in the Finnish Naisten I-divisioona with Porin Ässät, in addition to playing four games with Viking Moscow in the RWHL. She was joined on the Ässät roster by national team and Viking teammate Violetta Simanova. Tsaryova ranked second of all players for scoring in the Naisten I-divisioona, recording 12 goals and 9 assists for 21 points in thirteen games played.
