= Alexander Korolyuk =

Russian ice hockey player

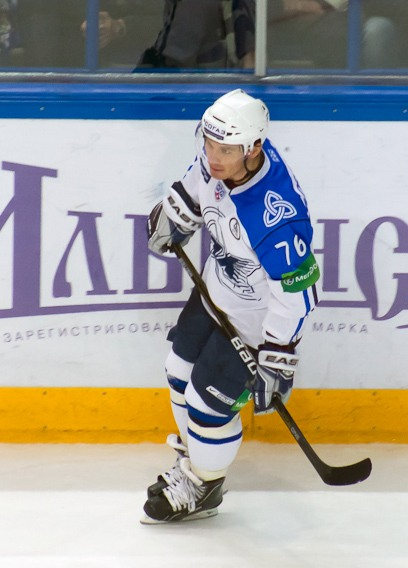
- Born: January 15, 1976 (age 50) Moscow, Russian SFSR, Soviet Union
- Height: 5 ft 9 in (175 cm)
- Weight: 187 lb (85 kg; 13 st 5 lb)
- Position: Left wing
- Shot: Left
- Played for: Krylya Sovetov; San Jose Sharks; Ak Bars Kazan; HC Vityaz; Khimik Voskresensk; Atlant Mytishchi; SKA St. Petersburg; Lokomotiv Yaroslavl; Neftekhimik Nizhnekamsk; Metallurg Magnitogorsk; HC Yugra
- National team: Russia
- NHL draft: 141st overall, 1994; San Jose Sharks
- Playing career: 1993–2015

Alexander Ivanovich Korolyuk (Russian: Александр Иванович Королюк, born January 15, 1976) is a Russian former professional ice hockey winger who played in the National Hockey League (NHL) with the San Jose Sharks before playing the remainder of his career in the Kontinental Hockey League (KHL).

Korolyuk was drafted in the sixth round, 141st overall, by the San Jose Sharks in the 1994 NHL entry draft.

== Playing career ==
As a youth, Korolyuk played in the 1990 Quebec International Pee-Wee Hockey Tournament with a team from Moscow.

Korolyuk was drafted 141st overall by the San Jose Sharks in 1994 NHL entry draft, from PHC Krylya Sovetov.

Three years later, he jumped to the NHL, making the opening night roster for the Sharks. However, he spent the majority of that season playing in the American Hockey League. Differences with then-head coach Darryl Sutter caused Korolyuk to be a contract hold-out at the start of the 2000–01 NHL season. He would eventually play 70 games for the Sharks that season. Korolyuk only played 32 games the next season and left the team after continued problems with Sutter. He played all of 2002–03 with Ak Bars Kazan.

While playing in Russia, Sutter was fired, paving the way for his return to the Sharks in 2003–04. Playing primarily on the second line with Alyn McCauley and Nils Ekman, Korolyuk posted a career-high 37 points.

That would be his final season in the NHL, however, as Korolyuk returned to Russia during the 2004–05 NHL lockout. On 1 October 2006, his rights were traded to the New Jersey Devils, along with Jim Fahey, for Vladimir Malakhov and a first-round draft pick. Later that season, Korolyuk became interested in an NHL return and requested to Devils management that his rights be traded back to the Sharks. His request was granted and the Sharks re-acquired him 16 February 2007 for a third-round draft pick, only to have the trade voided six days later when Korolyuk did not report for his physical in the allotted time period.

Korolyuk continued his playing career in the Kontinental Hockey League, playing for HC Vityaz, Atlant Mytishchi, SKA St. Petersburg, Lokomotiv Yaroslavl, Neftekhimik Nizhnekamsk, Metallurg Magnitogorsk and HC Yugra.

== Career statistics ==
=== Regular season and playoffs ===
			Regular season					Playoffs
Season	Team	League	GP	G	A	Pts	PIM	GP	G	A	Pts	PIM
1992–93	Krylya Sovetov–2 Moscow	RUS.2	41	4	3	7	18	—	—	—	—	—
1993–94	Krylya Sovetov Moscow	RUS	22	4	4	8	20	3	1	0	1	4
1994–95	Krylya Sovetov Moscow	RUS	52	16	13	29	62	4	1	2	3	4
1995–96	Krylya Sovetov Moscow	RUS	50	30	19	49	77	—	—	—	—	—
1996–97	Krylya Sovetov Moscow	RSL	17	8	5	13	46	—	—	—	—	—
1996–97	Manitoba Moose	IHL	42	20	16	36	71	—	—	—	—	—
1997–98	San Jose Sharks	NHL	19	2	3	5	6	—	—	—	—	—
1997–98	Kentucky Thoroughblades	AHL	44	16	23	39	96	3	0	0	0	0
1998–99	San Jose Sharks	NHL	55	12	18	30	26	6	1	3	4	2
1998–99	Kentucky Thoroughblades	AHL	23	9	13	22	16	—	—	—	—	—
1999–2000	San Jose Sharks	NHL	57	14	21	35	35	9	0	3	3	6
2000–01	Ak Bars Kazan	RSL	6	0	5	5	4	—	—	—	—	—
2000–01	San Jose Sharks	NHL	70	12	13	25	41	2	0	0	0	0
2001–02	San Jose Sharks	NHL	32	3	7	10	14	—	—	—	—	—
2002–03	Ak Bars Kazan	RSL	45	14	17	31	46	4	0	0	0	0
2003–04	San Jose Sharks	NHL	63	19	18	37	18	17	5	2	7	10
2004–05	Khimik Voskresensk	RSL	10	4	3	7	12	—	—	—	—	—
2005–06	Vityaz Chekhov	RSL	45	19	19	38	80	—	—	—	—	—
2006–07	Vityaz Chekhov	RSL	47	17	28	45	76	3	0	0	0	8
2007–08	Vityaz Chekhov	RSL	50	16	36	52	52	—	—	—	—	—
2008–09	Atlant Mytishchi	KHL	56	21	32	53	32	7	2	3	5	8
2009–10	SKA St. Petersburg	KHL	54	8	21	29	38	4	1	0	1	2
2010–11	Lokomotiv Yaroslavl	KHL	48	14	26	40	30	18	3	9	12	32
2011–12	Neftekhimik Nizhnekamsk	KHL	50	8	26	34	26	—	—	—	—	—
2012–13	Vityaz Chekhov	KHL	41	15	14	29	51	—	—	—	—	—
2012–13	Metallurg Magnitogorsk	KHL	5	0	1	1	0	7	2	2	4	8
2013–14	Vityaz Podolsk	KHL	30	7	12	19	33	—	—	—	—	—
2014–15	Neftekhimik Nizhnekamsk	KHL	12	2	2	4	14	—	—	—	—	—
2014–15	HC Yugra	KHL	30	5	8	13	12	—	—	—	—	—
RSL totals			221	78	108	186	324	7	0	0	0	5
NHL totals			296	62	80	142	140	34	6	8	14	18
KHL totals			326	80	142	222	236	36	8	14	22	50

=== International ===
Year	Team	Event	Result	GP	G	A	Pts	PIM
1994	Russia	EJC	2nd place, silver medalist(s)	5	2	3	5	0
1995	Russia	WJC	2nd place, silver medalist(s)	7	8	2	10	47
1996	Russia	WJC	3rd place, bronze medalist(s)	7	5	2	7	4
1997	Russia	WC	4th	6	2	3	5	6
2001	Russia	WC	6th	7	1	1	2	6
2006	Russia	OG	4th	6	1	1	2	6
Junior totals				19	15	7	22	51
Senior totals				19	4	5	9	18

== Awards and honours ==
Award	Year
KHL
All-Star Game	2013
