= 2001 IIHF Women's World Championship =

Tournament details
- Host country: United States
- Venues: 6 (in 6 host cities)
- Dates: April 2–8, 2001
- Opened by: George W. Bush
- Teams: 8

Final positions
- Champions: Canada (7th title)
- Runners-up: United States
- Third place: Russia
- Fourth place: Finland

Tournament statistics
- Games played: 20
- Goals scored: 143 (7.15 per game)
- Attendance: 21,847 (1,092 per game)
- Scoring leader: (United States) Cammi Granato (13 points)

Awards
- MVP: (Canada) Jennifer Botterill

The 2001 IIHF Women's World Championship was the seventh edition of the Women's Ice Hockey World Championship. The Top Division tournament was held from April 2 to 8, 2001 in six cities in the state of Minnesota. Venues included the Ice Center in Plymouth, the Mariucci Arena in Minneapolis, the Recreation Centre in Rochester, the Herb Brooks National Hockey Center in St. Cloud, the Columbia Arena in Fridley, and the Schwan Super Rink, in Blaine. Team Canada won their seventh consecutive gold medal at the World Championships defeating the United States. Russia upset Finland 2–1 to capture their first medal in women's hockey.

== Teams ==
With the promotion and relegation format now in use, the top seven nations were joined by Kazakhstan, the winner of Group B in 2000.

- Canada
- China
- Finland
- Germany
- Kazakhstan
- Russia
- Sweden
- United States

== World Championship Group A ==
The eight participating teams were divided up into two seeded groups as below. The teams played each other once in a single round robin format. The top two teams from the group proceeded to the Final Round, while the remaining teams played in the Consolation Round.

== First round ==
=== Group A ===
==== Standings ====
Pos	Team	Pld	W	D	L	GF	GA	GD	Pts	Qualification
1	Canada	3	3	0	0	29	1	+28	6	Advanced to Final round
2	Russia	3	2	0	1	12	7	+5	4	Advanced to Final round
3	Sweden	3	1	0	2	3	17	−14	2	Sent to Consolation round
4	Kazakhstan	3	0	0	3	3	22	−19	0	Sent to Consolation round

Source: IIHF

==== Results ====
All times local

April 2, 2001; 4:00 pm	Sweden	0 – 3 (0 – 0, 0 – 2, 0 – 1)	Russia	Recreation Centre, Rochester; Attendance: 300

April 2, 2001; 7:30 pm	Kazakhstan	0 – 11 (0 – 4, 0 – 4, 0 – 3)	Canada	Recreation Centre, Rochester; Attendance: 301

April 3, 2001; 4:00 pm	Sweden	3 – 1 (1 – 0, 1 – 1, 1 – 0)	Kazakhstan	Recreation Centre, Rochester; Attendance: 303

April 3, 2001; 7:30 pm	Canada	5 – 1 (2 – 0, 3 – 1, 0 – 0)	Russia	Recreation Centre, Rochester; Attendance: 520

April 5, 2001; 4:05 pm	Canada	13 – 0 (4 – 0, 6 – 0, 3 – 0)	Sweden	Mariucci Arena, Minneapolis; Attendance: 1178

April 5, 2001; 7:30 pm	Russia	8 – 2 (3 – 0, 1 – 1, 4 – 1)	Kazakhstan	Schwan's Super Rink, Blaine; Attendance: 301

=== Group B ===
==== Standings ====
Pos	Team	Pld	W	D	L	GF	GA	GD	Pts	Qualification
1	United States	3	3	0	0	35	0	+35	6	Advanced to Final round
2	Finland	3	2	0	1	12	17	−5	4	Advanced to Final round
3	China	3	0	1	2	6	20	−14	1	Sent to Consolation round
4	Germany	3	0	1	2	2	18	−16	1	Sent to Consolation round

Source: IIHF

==== Results ====
All times local

April 2, 2001; 4:00 pm	Finland	7 – 6 (4 – 3, 1 – 1, 2 – 2)	China	NHC, St. Cloud; Attendance: 300

April 2, 2001; 7:30 pm	Germany	0 – 13 (0 – 5, 0 – 6, 0 – 2)	United States	NHC, St. Cloud; Attendance: 301

April 3, 2001; 4:00 pm	Finland	5 – 2 (0 – 1, 3 – 1, 2 – 0)	Germany	NHC, St. Cloud; Attendance: 300

April 3, 2001; 7:30 pm	United States	13 – 0 (6 – 0, 3 – 0, 4 – 0)	China	NHC, St. Cloud; Attendance: 581

April 5, 2001; 7:30 pm	China	0 – 0 (0 – 0, 0 – 0, 0 – 0)	Germany	Ice Center, Plymouth; Attendance: 300

April 5, 2001; 7:35 pm	United States	9 – 0 (3 – 0, 5 – 0, 1 – 0)	Finland	Mariucci Arena, Minneapolis; Attendance: 4421

== Playoff round ==
=== Consolation round 5–8 place ===
April 6, 2001; 4:00 pm	China	4 – 1 (2 – 0, 1 – 1, 1 – 0)	Kazakhstan	Columbia Arena, Fridley; Attendance: 301

April 6, 2001; 7:30 pm	Sweden	2 – 6 (1 – 2, 1 – 1, 0 – 3)	Germany	Columbia Arena, Fridley; Attendance: 305

=== Consolation round 7–8 place ===
April 8, 2001; 12:00 pm	Kazakhstan	1 – 3	Sweden	Schwan's Super Rink, Blaine; Attendance: 305

=== Consolation round 5–6 place ===
April 8, 2001; 12:00 pm	Germany	1 – 0 (1 – 0, 0 – 0, 0 – 0)	China	Columbia Arena, Fridley

=== Final round ===
Semi finals 7 April 2001
A1	Canada	8
B2	Finland	0
B1	United States	6
A2	Russia	1

Finals; 8 April 2001
Canada	3
United States	2
Bronze Medal Game
Russia	2
Finland	1

=== Semifinals ===
April 7, 2001; 3:08 pm	Canada	8 – 0 (2 – 0, 2 – 0, 4 – 0)	Finland	Mariucci Arena, Minneapolis; Attendance: 1603

April 7, 2001; 7:38 pm	United States	6 – 1 (2 – 1, 3 – 0, 1 – 0)	Russia	Mariucci Arena, Minneapolis; Attendance: 2582

=== Match for third place ===
April 8, 2001; 4:00 pm	Russia	2 – 1 (1 – 0, 1 – 1, 0 – 0)	Finland	Mariucci Arena, Minneapolis; Attendance: 1558

=== Final ===
April 8, 2001; 18:08	United States	2–3 (1–1, 0–1, 1–1)	Canada	Mariucci Arena, Minneapolis; Attendance: 5,632

Sarah Tueting
Goalies
Kim St-Pierre
Referee:
(Canada) Chantal Champagne
Linesmen:
(Finland) Johanna Suban
(United States) Julie Piacentini

	0–1	08:09 – Antal (Drolet, Sunohara) (PP)
Zaban (Holmes) – 17:36	1–1
	1–2	29:45 – Shewchuk (Bechard, Chartrand)
	1–3	56:45 – Botterill (Brisson)
Mleczko (Wendell, Bye) (PP) – 58:41	2–3

10 min
Penalties
8 min
35
Shots
18

2001 IIHF World Women Championship winners

Canada
7th title

== Statistics ==
=== Scoring leaders ===
Player	GP	G	A	Pts	PIM	+/-
(United States) Cammi Granato	5	7	6	13	0	16
(United States) Krissy Wendell	5	3	9	12	4	10
(Canada) Nancy Drolet	5	4	7	11	4	7
(Canada) Jennifer Botterill	5	8	2	10	4	11
(Russia) Ekaterina Pashkevich	5	6	4	10	2	5
(United States) Jenny Schmidgall	5	3	7	10	4	15
(Canada) Kelly Bechard	5	1	9	10	8	10
(Canada) Tammy Shewchuk	5	5	4	9	2	11
(Canada) Danielle Goyette	5	4	5	9	0	8
(United States) Katie King	5	7	1	8	0	10

=== Goaltending leaders ===
Player	Mins	GA	SOG	GAA	SV%
(United States) Sara Decosta	120:00	1	40	0.50	97.50
(Canada) Kim St-Pierre	180:00	2	64	0.67	96.88
(Canada) Sami Jo Small	120:00	1	21	0.50	95.24
(United States) Sarah Tueting	178:49	3	45	1.01	93.33
(Russia) Irina Gachennikova	286:07	13	150	2.73	91.33

== Final standings ==
Rk.	Team	Notes
1st place, gold medalist(s)	Canada	
2nd place, silver medalist(s)	United States	
3rd place, bronze medalist(s)	Russia	
4.	Finland	
5.	Germany	
6.	China	
7.	Sweden	
8.	Kazakhstan	Relegated to the 2003 World Championships Division I

== Rosters ==
Medal	Team	Players
1st place, gold medalist(s)	Canada	Sami Jo Small, Becky Kellar, Colleen Sostorics, Therese Brisson, Cheryl Pounder, Caroline Ouellette, Danielle Goyette, Jayna Hefford, Jennifer Botterill, Nancy Drolet, Correne Bredin, Dana Antal, Kelly Bechard, Tammy Shewchuk, Gina Kingsbury, Kim St-Pierre, Vicky Sunohara, Isabelle Chartrand, Cassie Campbell, Geraldine Heaney
2nd place, silver medalist(s)	United States	Sara DeCosta, Winny Brodt, Angela Ruggiero, Nicki Luongo, Karyn Bye, Sue Merz, A.J. Mleczko, Jenny Schmidgall, Julie Chu, Shelley Looney, Krissy Wendell, Alana Blahoski, Annamarie Holmes, Katie King, Cammi Granato, Natalie Darwitz, Chris Bailey, Tricia Dunn, Carisa Zaban, Sarah Tueting
3rd place, bronze medalist(s)	Russia	Maria Misropian, Kristina Petrovskaia, Alena Khomitch, Elena Bobrova, Violetta Simanova, Larisa Mishina, Tatiana Sotnikova, Yulia Gladysheva, Ekaterina Smolentseva, Tatiana Tsareva, Luidmila Yurlova, Irina Gachennikova, Svetlana Trefilova, Svetlana Terentieva, Tatiana Burina, Ekaterina Pashkevich, Olga Savenkova, Oksana Tretiakova, Zhanna Shchelchkova, Irina Votintseva

== World Championship Division I ==
World Championship Group B was renamed Division I and was played again with an eight team tournament which was hosted by Briançon in France. Switzerland won the tournament with a 2–1 victory over Japan to see them bounce straight back to the main World Championship in 2003.

== Directorate Awards ==
- Goalie: Kim St-Pierre (Canada)
- Defender: Karyn Bye (United States)
- Forward: Jennifer Botterill (Canada)
- Most Valuable Player: Jennifer Botterill (Canada)
