= Vladimir Malakhov (ice hockey) =

Russian ice hockey player (born 1968)

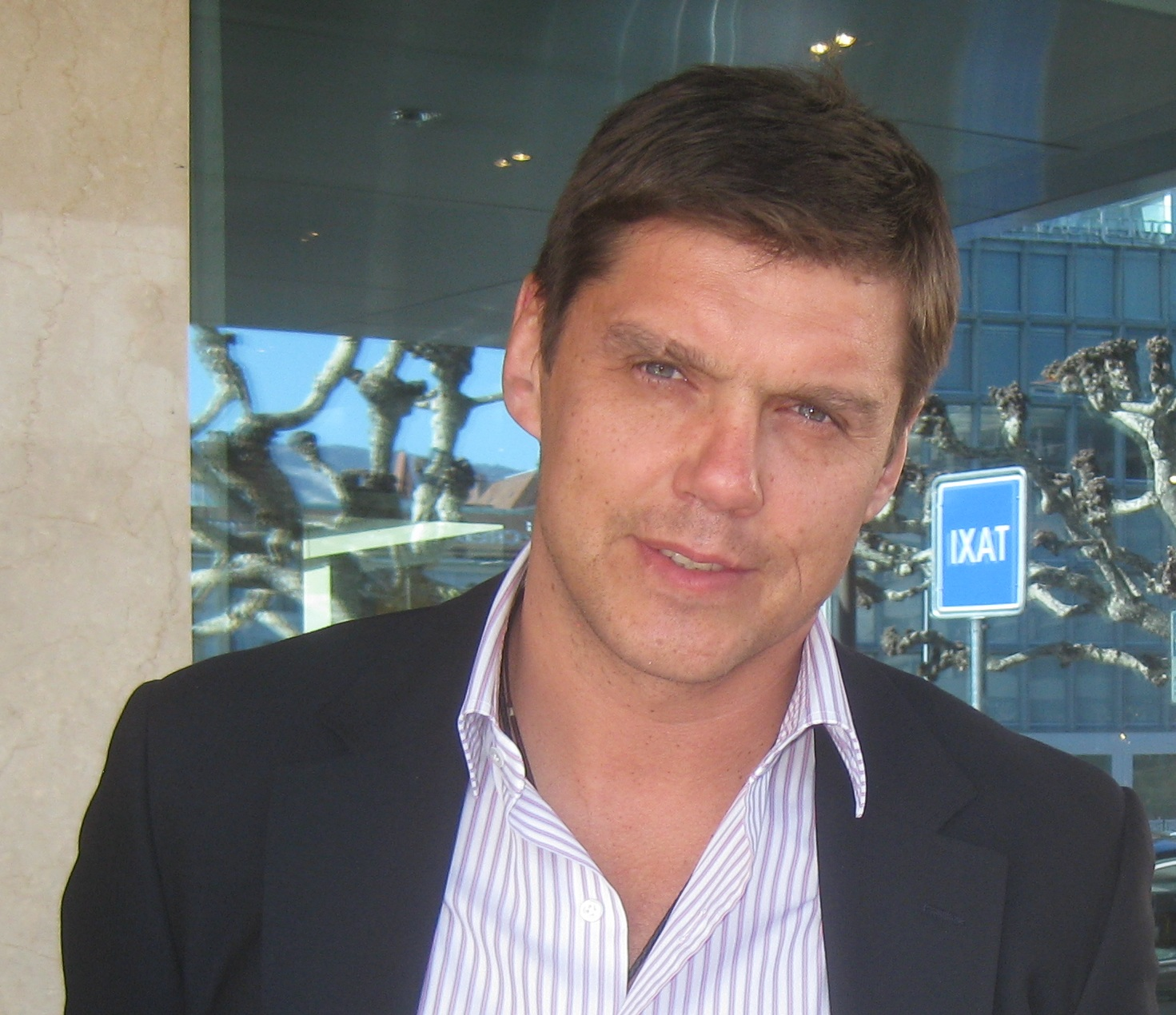
- Malakhov in 2011
- Born: August 30, 1968 (age 57) Sverdlovsk, Russian SFSR, Soviet Union
- Height: 6 ft 4 in (193 cm)
- Weight: 227 lb (103 kg; 16 st 3 lb)
- Position: Defence
- Shot: Left
- Played for: Spartak Moscow; CSKA Moscow; New York Islanders; Montreal Canadiens; New Jersey Devils; New York Rangers; Philadelphia Flyers
- National team: Soviet Union, Unified Team and Russia
- NHL draft: 191st overall, 1989; New York Islanders
- Playing career: 1986–2005

Medal record

Men's ice hockey

Olympic Games

Representing Unified Team
Gold medal – first place	1992 Albertville	

Representing Russia
Bronze medal – third place	2002 Salt Lake City	

World Championships

Representing Soviet Union
Gold medal – first place	1990 Switzerland	
Bronze medal – third place	1991 Finland	

Vladimir Igorevich Malakhov (Russian: Владимир Игоревич Малахов; born August 30, 1968) is a Russian former professional ice hockey player of the National Hockey League (NHL). He has also played in the Russian Super League. Currently, Malakhov is a Player Development coach for the New York Islanders.

Malakhov was drafted by the New York Islanders in the 1989 NHL entry draft, tenth round, 191st overall. He has played for Spartak Moscow, CSKA Moscow, New York Islanders, Montreal Canadiens, New Jersey Devils (winning the Stanley Cup in 2000), New York Rangers and the Philadelphia Flyers.

== Transactions ==
- June 17, 1989 – New York Islanders' 10th round draft choice (191st overall) in the 1989 NHL Entry Draft.
- April 5, 1995 – Traded by the New York Islanders, along with Pierre Turgeon to the Montreal Canadiens in exchange for Craig Darby, Kirk Muller and Mathieu Schneider.
- March 1, 2000 – Traded by the Montreal Canadiens to the New Jersey Devils in exchange for Sheldon Souray, Josh Dewolf and New Jersey's 2001 2nd round draft choice.
- July 10, 2000 – Signed as a free agent with the New York Rangers
- March 8, 2004 – Traded by the New York Rangers to the Philadelphia Flyers in exchange for Rick Kozak and Philadelphia's 2005 2nd round draft choice.
- August 5, 2005 – Signed as a free agent with the New Jersey Devils.
- October 1, 2006 – Traded by the New Jersey Devils, along with a conditional 1st round draft choice, to the San Jose Sharks in exchange for Alexander Korolyuk and Jim Fahey.

== Controversies ==
In 1999, Donald Trump’s lawyer, Michael Cohen, was given a check for $350,000 from Malakhov to be given as a loan to his friend, Yulia Fomina. The friend, however, swore in an affidavit that she never received the money and never even knew the check had been written until it was discovered years later in a Florida lawsuit.

During the 1999-2000 NHL season, Malakhov came under fire from Canadiens head coach Alain Vigneault, after it was revealed that he went on a ski trip to a resort in Mont-Tremblant, Quebec with his family during the All-Star break. This proved to be controversial with team management, as he hadn't played with the team all season, as he was recovering from a knee injury. As he was in breach of his contract, Malakhov was suspended by the Canadiens as a result.

Malakhov further angered Canadiens fans and coaches after he returned to the lineup following his suspension, after he responded to jeers by waving obscene gestures at fans which prompted louder jeers. When asked about it, Malakhov lashed out at the team's fans for his reaction. Malakhov, who was slated to become an unrestricted free agent at the end of the season, was traded to the New Jersey Devils weeks later.

On December 19, 2005, reports surfaced that Malakhov, who joined the Devils for the second time, had unexpectedly retired from the NHL. However, shortly after the story broke, his agent claimed that Malakhov had not retired and was taking a leave of absence "to deal with some internal, personal and medical issues." This claim was disputed by Lou Lamoriello, Devils CEO, president, general manager, and interim head coach. Lamoriello rejected the request for a leave of absence and treated Malakhov's absence as a retirement. This marked the end of Malakhov's pro career.

== Achievements ==
- Olympic Bronze Medal (2002)
- 1999–2000 Stanley Cup (New Jersey)
- NHL All-Rookie Team (1993)
- Olympic Gold Medal (1992)

== Career statistics ==
=== Regular season and playoffs ===
			Regular season					Playoffs
Season	Team	League	GP	G	A	Pts	PIM	GP	G	A	Pts	PIM
1986–87	Spartak Moscow	USSR	22	0	1	1	12	—	—	—	—	—
1987–88	Spartak Moscow	USSR	28	2	2	4	26	—	—	—	—	—
1988–89	CSKA Moscow	USSR	34	6	2	8	16	—	—	—	—	—
1989–90	CSKA Moscow	USSR	48	2	10	12	34	—	—	—	—	—
1990–91	CSKA Moscow	USSR	46	5	13	18	22	—	—	—	—	—
1991–92	CSKA Moscow	CIS	32	0	8	8	12	8	1	1	2	0
1992–93	Capital District Islanders	AHL	3	2	1	3	11	—	—	—	—	—
1992–93	New York Islanders	NHL	64	14	38	52	59	17	3	6	9	12
1993–94	New York Islanders	NHL	76	10	47	57	80	4	0	0	0	6
1994–95	New York Islanders	NHL	26	3	13	16	32	—	—	—	—	—
1994–95	Montreal Canadiens	NHL	14	1	4	5	14	—	—	—	—	—
1995–96	Montreal Canadiens	NHL	61	5	23	28	79	—	—	—	—	—
1996–97	Montreal Canadiens	NHL	65	10	20	30	43	5	0	0	0	6
1997–98	Montreal Canadiens	NHL	74	13	31	44	70	9	3	4	7	10
1998–99	Montreal Canadiens	NHL	62	13	21	34	77	—	—	—	—	—
1999–2000	Montreal Canadiens	NHL	7	0	0	0	4	—	—	—	—	—
1999–2000	New Jersey Devils	NHL	17	1	4	5	19	23	1	4	5	18
2000–01	New York Rangers	NHL	3	0	2	2	4	—	—	—	—	—
2001–02	New York Rangers	NHL	81	6	22	28	83	—	—	—	—	—
2002–03	New York Rangers	NHL	71	3	14	17	52	—	—	—	—	—
2003–04	New York Rangers	NHL	56	3	15	18	53	—	—	—	—	—
2003–04	Philadelphia Flyers	NHL	6	0	1	1	2	17	1	5	6	12
2005–06	New Jersey Devils	NHL	29	4	5	9	26	—	—	—	—	—
USSR/CIS totals			210	15	36	51	122	8	1	1	2	0
NHL totals			712	86	260	346	697	75	8	19	27	64

=== International ===
Year	Team	Event	Result	GP	G	A	Pts	PIM
1987	Soviet Union	WJC	DQ	6	0	0	0	4
1990	Soviet Union	WC	1st place, gold medalist(s)	10	0	1	1	10
1991	Soviet Union	WC	3rd place, bronze medalist(s)	10	0	0	0	4
1991	Soviet Union	CC	5th	5	0	0	0	4
1992	Unified Team	OG	1st place, gold medalist(s)	8	3	0	3	4
1992	Russia	WC	5th	6	2	1	3	4
1996	Russia	WCH	SF	4	1	0	1	8
2002	Russia	OG	3rd place, bronze medalist(s)	6	1	3	4	4
Senior totals				49	7	5	12	38
