= Larisa Mishina =

Russian ice hockey player

Personal information
- Nationality: Russian
- Born: 10 September 1975 (age 50) Moscow, Russia

Sport
- Sport: Ice hockey
Medal record
Women's ice hockey
Representing Russia
World Championships
Bronze medal – third place	2001 United States

Larisa Mishina (born 10 September 1975) is a Russian ice hockey player. She competed in the women's tournaments at the 2002 Winter Olympics and the 2006 Winter Olympics.
