= Oksana Tretyakova =

Russian ice hockey player

Oksana Tretyakova Оксана Третьякова
- Born: 10 March 1979 (age 47) Krasnoyarsk, Russian SFSR, Soviet Union
- Height: 1.62 m (5 ft 4 in)
- Weight: 72 kg (159 lb; 11 st 5 lb)
- Position: Forward
- Shot: Left
- Played for: Biryusa Krasnoyarsk; SKIF Nizhny Novgorod
- National team: Russia
- Playing career: 1996–2020
Medal record
Women's ice hockey
Representing Russia
World Championship
Bronze medal – third place	2001 United States

Oksana Vitalyevna Tretyakova (Russian: Оксана Витальевна Третьякова, also transliterated as Oxana Tretyakova; born 10 March 1979) is a Russian retired ice hockey player. She represented Russia in the women’s ice hockey tournaments at the Winter Olympics in 2002 and 2006, and at seven IIHF Women's World Championships.

Her club career, which spanned more than twenty-seasons, was played in the Zhenskaya Hockey League (ZhHL) and its predecessor, the Russian Women's Hockey League, with HC SKIF and Biryusa Krasnoyarsk.
