= Yuliya Gladysheva =

Russian ice hockey player

Personal information
- Nationality: Russian
- Born: 4 December 1981 (age 44) Moscow, Russia

Sport
- Sport: Ice hockey
Medal record
Women's ice hockey
Representing Russia
World Championships
| Bronze medal – third place | 2001 United States |

Yuliya Gladysheva (born 4 December 1981) is a Russian ice hockey player. She competed in the women's tournaments at the 2002 Winter Olympics and the 2006 Winter Olympics.
