= Vitali Glushchenko (skier) =

Russian freestyle skier

Personal information
- Nationality: Russian
- Born: 14 March 1977 (age 48); Tomsk, Russia

Sport
- Sport: Freestyle skiing

Vitali Glushchenko (born 14 March 1977) is a Russian freestyle skier. He competed at the 1998 Winter Olympics, the 2002 Winter Olympics, and the 2006 Winter Olympics.
