= Yelena Byalkovskaya =

Russian ice hockey player

Personal information
- Nationality: Russian
- Born: 22 March 1977 (age 48) Moscow, Russia

Sport
- Sport: Ice hockey

Yelena Byalkovskaya (born 22 March 1977) is a Russian ice hockey player. She competed in the women's tournaments at the 2002 Winter Olympics and the 2006 Winter Olympics.
