= Svetlana Trefilova =

Russian ice hockey player

Svetlana Trefilova Светла́на Трефи́лова
- Born: 20 May 1973 (age 53) Sverdlovsk, Russian SFSR, Soviet Union
- Height: 165 cm (5 ft 5 in)
- Weight: 60 kg (132 lb; 9 st 6 lb)
- Position: Forward
- Shot: Left
- Played for: Tornado Moscow; Viking Moscow
- National team: Russia
- Playing career: c. 1995–2007
Medal record
Representing Russia
Women's ice hockey
World Championship
Bronze medal – third place	2001 United States

Svetlana Rudolfovna Trefilova (Russian: Светла́на Рудо́льфовна Трефи́лова; born 20 May 1973) is a Russian retired ice hockey player. She competed in the women's ice hockey tournaments at the 2002 Winter Olympics and the 2006 Winter Olympics.
