= Irina Gashennikova =

Russian ice hockey player

Irina Gashennikova Ирина Гашенникова
- Born: 11 May 1975 (age 51) Moscow, Russian SSR, Soviet Union
- Height: 164 cm (5 ft 5 in)
- Weight: 62 kg (137 lb; 9 st 11 lb)
- Position: Goaltender
- Caught: Left
- Played for: SKIF Nizhny Novgorod; Spartak-Merkury; Fakel Chelyabinsk; Tornado Moscow Region
- National team: Russia
- Playing career: 1997–2016
Medal record
Representing Russia
Women's ice hockey
World Championships
| Bronze medal – third place | 2001 United States |

Irina Vladimirovna Gashennikova (Russian: Ирина Владимировна Гашенникова, born 11 May 1975) is a Russian retired ice hockey goaltender.

== International career ==
Gashennikova represented Russia with the Russian national team at the Winter Olympic Games in 2002, 2006 and 2010. In the women's ice hockey tournament at the 2002 Salt Lake City Olympics, she played every minute in net for Team Russia, winning three games and posting a 93.26% save percentage, the fourth-best save percentage of the tournament. In the 2006 tournament, she again played in every game, claiming two victories as Russia finished 6th. At the 2010 tournament, she played four of Russia's five games, winning two, and posted 2.40 goals against average.

Gashennikova also appeared for Russia at seven IIHF Women's World Championships. Her first appearance came in 1997 IIHF Women's World Championship, where twenty-two goals were scored on her in five games. The most notable of these performances came in 2001 IIHF Women's World Championship, where she won three games to lead Russia to a bronze medal, the country's first in women's play.

== Career statistics ==
=== International career ===
| Year | Team | Event | Result | GP | W | L | OT | MIN | GA | SO | GAA | SVS% |
|---|---|---|---|---|---|---|---|---|---|---|---|---|
| 1997 | Russia | WW | 6th | 5 | 1 | 3 | 1 | 240:00 | 22 | 0 | 5.50 |
| 1999 | Russia | WW | 6th | 3 | 0 | 3 | 0 | 158:51 | 15 | 0 | 5.67 | 85.0 |
| 2000 | Russia | WW | 5th | 3 | 2 | 1 | 0 | 220:00 | 13 | 0 | 3.55 | 85.23 |
| 2001 | Russia | WW | 3rd place, bronze medalist(s) | 5 | 3 | 2 | 0 | 286:07 | 13 | 0 | 2.73 | 91.33 |
| 2002 | Russia | Oly | 5th | 5 | 3 | 2 | 0 | 300:00 | 12 | 1 | 2.40 | 93.26 |
| 2004 | Russia | WW | | 4 | 2 | 2 | 0 | 240:00 | 13 | 0 | 3.25 | 91.61 |
| 2006 | Russia | Oly | 6th | 5 | 2 | 3 | 0 | 266:25 | 12 | 0 | 2.70 | 87.63 |
| 2007 | Russia | WW | 7th | 4 | 2 | 2 | 0 | 220:00 | 8 | 0 | 2.18 | 91.11 |
| 2009 | Russia | WW | 5th | 4 | 2 | 0 | 0 | 148:50 | 8 | 0 | 3.23 | 88.89 |
| 2010 | Russia | Oly | 6th | 4 | 2 | 2 | 0 | 250:00 | 10 | 0 | 2.40 | 90.20 |
| Senior totals |
