= Yekaterina Pashkevich =

Russian ice hockey player

- Born: December 19, 1972 (age 53) Moscow, Russian SSR, Soviet Union
- Height: 5 ft 9 in (175 cm)
- Weight: 163 lb (74 kg; 11 st 9 lb)
- Position: Forward
- Shoots: Left
- National team: Russia
- Playing career: 1997–present
Medal record
Representing Russia
Women's ice hockey
IIHF World Women's Championships
Bronze medal – third place	2001 Minnesota	Tournament
Bronze medal – third place	2013 Ottawa	Tournament

Yekaterina Vladimirovna Pashkevich (Russian: Екатерина Владимировна Пашкевич) (born December 19, 1972, in Moscow, Russian SSR, Soviet Union) is a Russian ice hockey forward.

On December 12, 2017, she and five other Russian hockey players were disqualified with their results at the 2014 Olympics annulled. The ban was overturned after the IOC reversed course in 2018.

== International career ==
Pashkevich was selected for the Russia women's national ice hockey team in the 2002, 2006 and 2014 Winter Olympics. In 2002, she led the team in scoring, with three goals and two assists in five games. In 2006, she had one assist in five games, and in 2014, she played in all six games, again recording one assist.

As of 2014, Pashkevich has also appeared for Russia at five IIHF Women's World Championships. Her appearance came in 1997. She won bronze medals with the team twice, in 2001 and 2013.

== Career statistics ==
=== International career ===
Through 2013–14 season

Year	Team	Event	GP	G	A	Pts	PIM
1997	Russia	WW	5	3	0	3	16
1999	Russia	WW	5	4	0	4	16
2000	Russia	WW	5	6	0	6	12
2001	Russia	WW	5	6	4	10	2
2002	Russia	Oly	5	3	2	5	2
2006	Russia	Oly	5	0	1	1	8
2013	Russia	WW	6	0	0	0	2
2014	Russia	Oly	6	0	1	1	0
