= Pyotr Makarchuk =

Russian bobsledder

Personal information
- Nationality: Russian
- Born: 10 July 1972 (age 52); Abakan, Russia

Sport
- Sport: Bobsleigh

Pyotr Makarchuk (born 10 July 1972) is a Russian bobsledder. He competed at the 2002 Winter Olympics and the 2006 Winter Olympics.
