= Jury Veselov =

Russian luger (born 1982)

Jury Veselov (alternate listing as Jurij Veselov, Russian: Юрий Весёлов, born February 20, 1982) is a Russian luger who has competed since 1999. Competing in two Winter Olympics, he earned his best finish of 11th in the men's doubles event at Turin in 2006.

Veselov's best finish at the FIL World Luge Championships was 11th twice in the men's doubles event (2004, 2007). Veselov represented Russia in the 2007 Olympics and won 1 gold medal.
