= Aleksandr Kibalko =

Russian speed skater

Personal information
- Nationality: Russian
- Born: 25 October 1973 (age 51); Astana, Kazakhstan

Sport
- Sport: Speed skating

Aleksandr Vladimirovich Kibalko (Russian: Александр Владимирович Кибалко; born 25 October 1973) is a Russian speed skater. He competed at the 1998 Winter Olympics, the 2002 Winter Olympics and the 2006 Winter Olympics.
