= Vladimir Lebedev (skier) =

Russian freestyle skier

Medal record

Men's Freestyle
Bronze medal – third place	2006 Turin	Men's Aerials

Vladimir Lebedev (Russian: Лебедев Владимир Николаевич; born April 23, 1984, in Tashkent) is a Russian freestyle skier who competed at the 2006 Winter Olympics in Turin, Italy. Lebedev won bronze in the men's aerials event.
