= Yury Kokhanets =

Russian speed skater

Personal information
- Native name: Юрий Николаевич Коханец
- Full name: Yury Nikolayevich Kokhanets
- Nationality: Russian
- Born: 15 February 1972 (age 54) Astana, Kazakhstan

Sport
- Sport: Speed skating

Yury Nikolayevich Kokhanets (Russian: Юрий Николаевич Коханеџ; born 15 February 1972) is a Russian speed skater. He competed at the 1998 Winter Olympics, the 2002 Winter Olympics and the 2006 Winter Olympics.
