= Dmitry Dorofeyev =

Russian speed skater

Personal information
- Native name: Дмитрий Анатольевич Дорофеев
- Full name: Dmitry Anatolyevich Dorofeyev
- Born: 13 November 1976 (age 49) Kolomna, Soviet Union
Medal record
Men's speed skating
Representing Russia
Olympic Games
Silver medal – second place	2006 Turin	500 m
World Sprint Championships
Silver medal – second place	2006 Heerenveen	Sprint

Dmitry Anatolyevich Dorofeyev (Russian: Дмитрий Анатольевич Дорофеев, born 13 November 1976) is a speed skater. Dorofeyev won a silver medal in the 500 m at the 2006 Winter Olympics. His second-place finish was Russia's first Olympic speed skating medal since 1994. He placed tenth in the 1,000 m event. Earlier that year, he won silver at the World Sprint Championships.
