= Mariya Barykina =

Russian ice hockey player

Mariya Barykina Мария Барыкина
- Born: 9 December 1973 (age 52) Moscow, Russian SFSR, Soviet Union
- Height: 170 cm (5 ft 7 in)
- Weight: 60 kg (132 lb; 9 st 6 lb)
- Position: Defense
- Shot: Right
- Played for: SKIF Moscow; Tornado Moscow Oblast
- National team: Russia
- Playing career: 1995–2009
Medal record
World Championshipyo
Bronze medal – third place	2001 United States
European Championship
Silver medal – second place	1996 Latvia

Mariya Mikhaylovna Barykina MS (née Misropyan; Russian: Мария Михайловна Барыкина (Мисропьян), also transliterated Maria Misropian; born 9 December 1973) is a Soviet-born Russian retired ice hockey player, a defenseman, and former member of the Russian national ice hockey team.

== Playing career ==
Barykina's Russian Women's Hockey League career was played with SKIF Moscow (previously Viking Moscow, CSK VVS Moscow, and Luzhniki Moscow; called SKIF Nizhny Novgorod since 2006) and Tornado Moscow Oblast during 1995 to 2009 and she was on Russian Championship winning teams at least six times. Barykina won a silver medal with Tornado Moscow Oblast in the 2006 IIHF European Women's Champions Cup.

=== International play ===
She represented Russia in the women's ice hockey tournament at the 2002 Winter Olympics in Salt Lake City, in the women's ice hockey tournament at the 2006 Winter Olympics in Turin, and at the IIHF Women's World Championship tournaments in 1997, 2000, 2001, 2005, and 2007, winning World Championship bronze in 2001. Her national team debut was made at the IIHF European Women Championship in 1995 and she won a silver medal with Russia at the 1996 tournament.
