= Zhanna Shchelchkova =

Russian ice hockey player

Personal information
- Nationality: Russian
- Born: 10 February 1969 (age 57) Moscow, Russia

Sport
- Sport: Ice hockey
Medal record
Women's ice hockey
Representing Russia
World Championships
Bronze medal – third place	2001 United States

Zhanna Shchelchkova (born 10 February 1969) is a Russian ice hockey player. She competed in the women's tournaments at the 2002 Winter Olympics and the 2006 Winter Olympics.
