= Bobsleigh at the 2006 Winter Olympics – Four-man =

Four-man at the XX Olympic Winter Games
- Pictogram for bobsleigh
- Venue: Cesana Pariol
- Dates: February 24–25, 2006
- Competitors: 104 from 19 nations
- Winning time: 3:40.42

Medalists
1st place, gold medalist(s)		Germany; André Lange, René Hoppe, Kevin Kuske, Martin Putze
2nd place, silver medalist(s)		Russia; Alexandre Zoubkov, Philippe Egorov, Alexei Seliverstov, Alexey Voevoda
3rd place, bronze medalist(s)		Switzerland; Martin Annen, Thomas Lamparter, Beat Hefti, Cedric Grand

The Four-man bobsleigh competition at the 2006 Winter Olympics in Turin, Italy was held on 24 and 25 February, at Cesana Pariol.

== Records ==
While the IOC does not consider bobsled times eligible for Olympic records, the FIBT does maintain records for both the start and a complete run at each track it competes.

Prior to this competition, the existing Cesana Pariol track records were as follows.

Type	Date	Team	Time
Start	23 January 2005	Switzerland; Martin Annen; Andi Gees; Beat Hefti; Cedric Grand	4.68
Run	23 January 2005	Switzerland; Martin Annen; Andi Gees; Beat Hefti; Cedric Grand	55.54

The following track records were established during this event.

Type	Date	Run	Team	Time
Run	24 February	1	United States (USA-1); Todd Hays; Pavle Jovanovic; Steve Mesler; Brock Kreitzburg	55.43
Run	24 February	1	Canada (CAN-1); Pierre Lueders; Ken Kotyk; Morgan Alexander; Lascelles Brown	55.34
Run	24 February	1	Russia (RUS-1); Alexandre Zoubkov; Philippe Egorov; Alexei Seliverstov; Alexey Voevoda	55.22
Run	24 February	1	Germany (GER-1); André Lange; René Hoppe; Kevin Kuske; Martin Putze	55.20
Run	25 February	3	Germany (GER-2); Rene Spies; Christoph Heyder; Enrico Kuehn; Alexander Metzger	54.91
Run	25 February	3	Germany (GER-1); André Lange; René Hoppe; Kevin Kuske; Martin Putze	54.80

== Results ==
Twenty-six sleds were entered in the four-man event, with one, from New Zealand, not starting the first run after crashing in training.

After the third run, only the top twenty sleds by combined time were allowed to compete in the final run. The final ranking was determined by the combined time of each sled over the four runs.

Rank	Country	Athletes	Run 1	Run 2	Run 3	Run 4	Total
Gold medal	Germany (GER-1)	André Lange; René Hoppe; Kevin Kuske; Martin Putze	55.20	55.30	54.80	55.12	3:40.42
Silver medal	Russia (RUS-1)	Alexandr Zubkov; Filipp Yegorov; Alexei Seliverstov; Alexey Voevoda	55.22	55.45	54.87	55.01	3:40.55
Bronze medal	Switzerland (SUI-1)	Martin Annen; Thomas Lamparter; Beat Hefti; Cedric Grand	55.26	55.37	55.00	55.20	3:40.83
4	Canada (CAN-1)	Pierre Lueders; Ken Kotyk; Morgan Alexander; Lascelles Brown	55.34	55.43	54.95	55.20	3:40.92
5	Germany (GER-2)	Rene Spies; Christoph Heyder; Enrico Kühn; Alexander Metzger	55.47	55.48	54.91	55.18	3:41.04
6	United States (USA-2)	Steve Holcomb; Curtis Tomasevicz; Bill Schuffenhauer; Lorenzo Smith III	55.46	55.50	55.14	55.26	3:41.36
7	United States (USA-1)	Todd Hays; Pavle Jovanovic; Steve Mesler; Brock Kreitzburg	55.43	55.56	55.04	55.41	3:41.44
8	Switzerland (SUI-2)	Ivo Rueegg; Andi Gees; Roman Handschin; Christian Aebli	55.65	55.63	55.22	55.30	3:41.80
9	Russia (RUS-2)	Yevgeni Popov; Sergey Golubev; Pyotr Makarchuk; Dmitriy Stepushkin	55.87	55.57	55.16	55.33	3:41.93
10	Latvia (LAT-1)	Jānis Miņins; Daumants Dreiškens; Mārcis Rullis; Jānis Ozols	55.88	55.69	55.51	55.51	3:42.59
11	Italy (ITA-2)	Fabrizio Tosini; Luca Ottolino; Antonio de Sanctis; Giorgio Morbidelli	55.80	55.73	55.57	55.51	3:42.61
12	Italy (ITA-1)	Simone Bertazzo; Samuele Romanini; Matteo Torchio; Omar Sacco	55.63	56.13	55.46	55.62	3:42.84
13	Austria	Wolfgang Stampfer; Klaus Seelos; Juergen Loacker; Hans-Peter Welz	55.77	55.83	55.73	55.53	3:42.86
14	Czech Republic	Ivo Danilevic; Radek Řechka; Roman Gomola; Jan Kobian	55.92	55.83	55.66	55.56	3:42.97
15	Poland	Dawid Kupczyk; Michal Zblewski; Mariusz Latkowski; Marcin Płacheta	55.89	55.79	55.85	55.49	3:43.02
16	Netherlands	Arend Glas; Vincent Kortbeek; Sybren Jansma; Arno Klaassen	55.82	56.08	55.78	55.51	3:43.19
17	Great Britain	Lee Johnston; Martin Wright; Karl Johnston; Dan Humphries	56.06	56.07	55.93	55.32	3:43.38
18	Canada (CAN-2)	Serge Despres; Nathan Cunningham; Steve Larsen; David Bissett	56.10	56.15	55.69	55.58	3:43.52
19	France	Bruno Mingeon; Christophe Fouquet; Pierre-Alain Menneron; Alexandre Vanhoutte	56.09	56.08	55.87	55.71	3:43.75
20	Slovakia	Milan Jagnesak; Viktor Rajek; Andrej Benda; Robert Krestanko	56.29	56.13	56.26	55.98	3:44.66
21	Latvia (LAT-2)	Mihails Arhipovs; Intars Dicmanis; Māris Bogdanovs; Reinis Rozitis	56.34	56.54	56.13	—	—
22	Romania (ROM)	Nicolae Istrate; Adrian Duminicel; Gabriel Popa; Ioan Danut Dovalciuc	56.61	56.70	56.41	—	—
23	Croatia	Ivan Šola; Slaven Krajačić; Alek Osmanović; Jurica Grabušić; Dejan Vojnović	56.67	56.57	56.51	—	—
24	Ireland	Peter O'Malley; Joseph Mullins; Patrick Mullins; John O’Donoghue	56.99	56.73	56.45	—	—
25	Brazil	Ricardo Raschini; Márcio Silva; Claudinei Quirino; Edson Bindilatti	60.31	58.51	60.12	—	—
—	New Zealand	Alan Henderson; Aaron Orangi; Steve Harrison; Matthew Dallow	DNS	—	—	—	—
