= Great Britain at the 2006 Winter Olympics =

- Flag of the United Kingdom
- IOC code: GBR
- NOC: British Olympic Association

in Turin
- Competitors: 41 in 9 sports
- Flag bearers: Rhona Martin (opening); Shelley Rudman (closing)
- Medals Ranked 21st: Gold 0 Silver 1 Bronze 0 Total 1

Winter Olympics appearances (overview)
- 1924; 1928; 1932; 1936; 1948; 1952; 1956; 1960; 1964; 1968; 1972; 1976; 1980; 1984; 1988; 1992; 1994; 1998; 2002; 2006; 2010; 2014; 2018; 2022; 2026

The United Kingdom competed under the name Great Britain at the 2006 Winter Olympics in Turin, Italy. Athletes from Northern Ireland were generally free to participate for either this team or the Ireland team under a long-standing settlement between the British Olympic Association and the Olympic Council of Ireland. Forty-one athletes were selected for these Winter Games.

== Medallists ==
Medal	Name	Sport	Event	Date
Silver	Shelley Rudman	Skeleton	Women's	16 February

== Alpine skiing ==
In the super-G and downhill, Chemmy Alcott was a rare female competitor in a historically male-dominated GB team. Alcott impressed as she finished 11th in the women's downhill, but was disqualified from the combined due to a technical infringement with the width of her skis.

Noel Baxter, Alain Baxter and James Leuzinger were the men's representatives in the slalom, and the Baxters also raced in the giant slalom. Finlay Mickel and Roger Cruickshank were the men's downhill and super-G skiers.

In the men's downhill, Finlay Mickel finished 25th, 2.68 seconds behind the winner Antoine Dénériaz. Roger Cruickshank, skiing with a knee-brace, finished 37th, 5.85 behind. Noel Baxter finished 14th in the men's combined. Cruickshank also finished 37th in the giant slalom before announcing his retirement from skiing.

Athlete	Event	Final				
Athlete	Event	Run 1	Run 2	Run 3	Total	Rank
Chemmy Alcott	Women's downhill	n/a			1:57.85	11
Chemmy Alcott	Women's super-G	n/a			1:34.20	19
Chemmy Alcott	Women's giant slalom	1:04.47	1:09.95	n/a	2:14.42	22
Chemmy Alcott	Women's combined	disqualified				
Alain Baxter	Men's slalom	54.93	51.22	n/a	1:46.15	16
Noel Baxter	Men's slalom	56.07	51.15	n/a	1:47.22	20
Noel Baxter	Men's combined	1:42.26	45.64	44.89	3:12.79	14
Roger Cruickshank	Men's downhill	n/a			1:54.65	37
Roger Cruickshank	Men's super-G	n/a			1:34.87	37
James Leuzinger	Men's slalom	did not finish				
Finlay Mickel	Men's downhill	n/a			1:51.48	25
Finlay Mickel	Men's super-G	n/a			1:32.10	22

Note: In the men's combined, run 1 is the downhill, and runs 2 and 3 are the slalom. In the women's combined, run 1 and 2 are the slalom, and run 3 the downhill.

== Biathlon ==
Athlete	Event	Final		
Athlete	Event	Time	Misses	Rank
Tom Clemens	Men's sprint	31:05.0	4	78
Tom Clemens	Men's individual	1:01:43.9	4	57
Emma Fowler	Women's sprint	26:22.9	1	67
Emma Fowler	Women's individual	1:03:38.9	7	78

== Bobsleigh ==
The men chosen for the 2-man and 4-man bobsleigh event were: Marcus Adam, Dan Humphries, Lee Johnston, Karl Johnston and Martin Wright.

The competitors for the 2-woman event were Nicola Minichiello and Jackie Davies.

Athlete	Event	Final					
Athlete	Event	Run 1	Run 2	Run 3	Run 4	Total	Rank
Lee Johnston; Dan Humphries	Two-man	56.22	55.84	57.21	57.08	3:46.34	15
Nicola Minichiello; Jackie Davies	Two-woman	57.78	57.49	58.41	58.48	3:52.16	9
Lee Johnston; Martin Wright; Karl Johnston; Dan Humphries	Four-man	56.06	56.07	55.93	55.32	3:43.38	17

== Curling ==
Britain sent two teams to the Olympic curling competition. All of the members of both teams were Scottish. The women's team were the defending Olympic gold medallists.

The members of the men's team were Euan Byers, Ewan McDonald, David Murdoch, Warwick Smith and Craig Wilson. The members of the women's team were Kelly Wood, Lynn Cameron, Deborah Knox, Jacqueline Lockhart and Rhona Martin.

=== Men's tournament ===
Team: David Murdoch, Ewan MacDonald, Warwick Smith, Euan Byers and Craig Wilson (alternate)

Round robin
Draw 1

Team	1	2	3	4	5	6	7	8	9	10	Final
Italy (Retornaz)	1	0	2	0	1	0	1	0	0	0	5
Great Britain (Murdoch)	0	3	0	2	0	1	0	0	0	1	7

;Draw 2

Team	1	2	3	4	5	6	7	8	9	10	Final
Great Britain (Murdoch)	0	1	4	0	0	0	3	0	2	X	10
New Zealand (Becker)	1	0	0	0	2	1	0	1	0	X	5

;Draw 4

Team	1	2	3	4	5	6	7	8	9	10	Final
Canada (Gushue)	1	1	0	3	0	1	1	0	2	X	9
Great Britain (Murdoch)	0	0	2	0	1	0	0	2	0	X	5

;Draw 5

Team	1	2	3	4	5	6	7	8	9	10	Final
Great Britain (Murdoch)	0	0	0	1	0	0	2	0	2	1	6
Norway (Trulsen)	0	1	0	0	0	1	0	1	0	0	3

;Draw 6

Team	1	2	3	4	5	6	7	8	9	10	Final
Great Britain (Murdoch)	0	0	0	2	0	2	1	0	2	0	7
Germany (Kapp)	0	0	2	0	0	0	0	2	0	2	6

;Draw 8

Team	1	2	3	4	5	6	7	8	9	10	Final
Sweden (Lindholm)	0	0	2	0	0	0	0	X	X	X	2
Great Britain (Murdoch)	2	2	0	3	0	0	1	X	X	X	8

;Draw 9

Team	1	2	3	4	5	6	7	8	9	10	Final
Switzerland (Stöckli)	2	0	0	0	0	0	1	2	0	0	5
Great Britain (Murdoch)	0	1	1	0	1	0	0	0	2	1	6

;Draw 10

Team	1	2	3	4	5	6	7	8	9	10	Final
Great Britain (Murdoch)	0	1	0	2	1	0	0	1	2	1	8
United States (Fenson)	2	0	4	0	0	1	2	0	0	0	9

;Draw 11

Team	1	2	3	4	5	6	7	8	9	10	Final
Great Britain (Murdoch)	0	0	0	0	1	0	0	0	1	X	2
Finland (Uusipaavalniemi)	0	0	3	0	0	1	1	0	0	X	5

Standings

Rank	Team	Skip	Won	Lost
1	Finland	Markku Uusipaavalniemi	7	2
2	Canada	Brad Gushue	6	3
3	United States	Pete Fenson	6	3
4	Great Britain	David Murdoch	6	3
5	Norway	Pål Trulsen	5	4
6	Switzerland	Ralph Stockli	5	4
7	Italy	Joel Retornaz	4	5
8	Sweden	Peter Lindholm	3	6
9	Germany	Andy Kapp	3	6
10	New Zealand	Sean Becker	0	9

Playoffs
Semi-final

Team	1	2	3	4	5	6	7	8	9	10	Final
Finland (Uusipaavalniemi)	0	1	0	0	0	2	0	0	0	1	4
Great Britain (Murdoch)	0	0	0	0	1	0	1	0	1	0	3

;Bronze Medal Game

Team	1	2	3	4	5	6	7	8	9	10	Final
United States (Fenson)	1	0	3	0	0	2	0	1	0	1	8
Great Britain (Murdoch)	0	1	0	1	0	0	3	0	1	0	6

=== Women's tournament ===
Team: Rhona Martin, Jacqueline Lockhart, Kelly Wood, Lynn Cameron and Deborah Knox (alternate)

Round robin
Draw 1

Team	1	2	3	4	5	6	7	8	9	10	Final
Great Britain (Martin)	0	1	0	0	0	1	0	0	0	1	3
Denmark (Holm)	0	0	0	0	1	0	0	1	0	0	2

;Draw 2

Team	1	2	3	4	5	6	7	8	9	10	Final
Switzerland (Ott)	0	0	0	2	1	0	1	0	0	0	4
Great Britain (Martin)	0	0	2	0	0	1	0	1	0	1	5

;Draw 4

Team	1	2	3	4	5	6	7	8	9	10	Final
Sweden (Norberg)	1	2	2	0	1	0	0	1	0	1	8
Great Britain (Martin)	0	0	0	2	0	2	0	0	2	0	6

;Draw 5

Team	1	2	3	4	5	6	7	8	9	10	Final
Russia (Privivkova)	0	2	0	0	2	0	0	0	0	0	4
Great Britain (Martin)	2	0	4	1	0	0	0	0	2	1	10

;Draw 7

Team	1	2	3	4	5	6	7	8	9	10	Final
Great Britain (Martin)	0	0	0	0	2	0	0	1	0	X	3
Canada (Kleibrink)	0	2	1	1	0	0	1	0	4	X	9

;Draw 8

Team	1	2	3	4	5	6	7	8	9	10	Final
Great Britain (Martin)	0	0	2	0	2	0	2	0	2	1	9
Italy (Gaspari)	0	1	0	2	0	1	0	1	0	0	5

;Draw 9

Team	1	2	3	4	5	6	7	8	9	10	Final
Great Britain (Martin)	0	0	3	0	0	0	1	0	0	X	4
Norway (Nordby)	2	0	0	1	1	1	0	1	2	X	8

;Draw 10

Team	1	2	3	4	5	6	7	8	9	10	Final
Great Britain (Martin)	0	0	0	1	0	3	0	1	0	X	5
Japan (Onodera)	0	2	1	0	3	0	1	0	3	X	10

;Draw 12

Team	1	2	3	4	5	6	7	8	9	10	Final
United States (Johnson)	0	1	0	3	0	0	X	X	X	X	4
Great Britain (Martin)	2	0	4	0	3	1	X	X	X	X	10

Standings

Rank	Team	Skip	Won	Lost
1	Sweden	Anette Norberg	7	2
2	Switzerland	Mirjam Ott	7	2
3	Canada	Shannon Kleibrink	6	3
4	Norway	Dordi Nordby	6	3
5	Great Britain	Rhona Martin	5	4
6	Russia	Ludmila Privivkova	5	4
7	Japan	Ayumi Onodera	4	5
8	Denmark	Dorthe Holm	2	7
9	United States	Cassandra Johnson	2	7
10	Italy	Diana Gaspari	1	8

== Figure skating ==
The British figure skating representatives were Sinead Kerr and her brother John Kerr, who competed in ice dancing. They hail from Scotland and Turin was their first Olympic games.

Athlete	Event	CD		SP/OD		FS/FD		Total	
Athlete	Event	Points	Rank	Points	Rank	Points	Rank	Points	Rank
Sinead Kerr; John Kerr	Ice dance	31.58	11	50.28	11	85.57	13	167.43	10

Key: CD = Compulsory Dance, FD = Free Dance, FS = Free Skate, OD = Original Dance, SP = Short Program

== Luge ==
The British luge participants for 2006 were Mark Hatton and Adam Rosen. Hatton finished a disappointing 35th place after coming off his luge on his third run of four, although he stayed in contact with the luge and remounted. Rosen finished in 16th place.

Athlete	Event	Final					
Athlete	Event	Run 1	Run 2	Run 3	Run 4	Total	Rank
Mark Hatton	Men's singles	52.790	52.720	1:34.895	52.494	4:12.899	35
Adam Rosen	Men's singles	52.610	52.130	52.093	52.150	3:28.983	16

== Short track speed skating ==
The men's short track speed skating team was Jon Eley and Paul Stanley. The women's team was Sarah Lindsay and Joanna Williams. Lindsay participated in the 2002 Winter Olympics in Salt Lake City.

This was the first Olympics in which Great Britain and Northern Ireland sent a full short track speed skating team.

Athlete	Event	Heat		Quarter-final		Semi-final		Final	
Athlete	Event	Time	Rank	Time	Rank	Time	Rank	Time	Rank
Jon Eley	Men's 500 m	42.511	2 Q	42.424	2 Q	42.650	3 ADV	42.497	5
Jon Eley	Men's 1000 m	1:29.147	3	did not advance					17
Jon Eley	Men's 1500 m	2:23.887	3 Q	n/a		2:21.862	5	did not advance	13
Sarah Lindsay	Women's 500 m	46.290	2 Q	1:09.785	3 ADV	46.060	5	did not advance	8
Sarah Lindsay	Women's 1000 m	1:35.539	3	did not advance					16
Sarah Lindsay	Women's 1500 m	2:38.460	3 Q	n/a		2:29.173	6	did not advance	15
Paul Stanley	Men's 500 m	43.486	4	did not advance					20
Paul Stanley	Men's 1000 m	1:28.511	4	did not advance					19
Joanna Williams	Women's 500 m	46.857	3	did not advance					19

Key: 'ADV' indicates a skater was advanced due to being interfered with.

== Skeleton ==
Two men and one woman skeleton athletes travelled to Turin. Shelley Rudman was selected as the woman's sole representative; the men were Kristan Bromley and Adam Pengilly

Shelley Rudman won the silver medal in the women's event, while Bromley and Pengilly finished fifth and eighth respectively.

Athlete	Event	Final			
Athlete	Event	Run 1	Run 2	Total	Rank
Kristan Bromley	Men's	58.35	58.75	1:57.10	5
Adam Pengilly	Men's	58.37	59.09	1:57.46	8
Shelley Rudman	Women's	1:00.57	1:00.49	2:01.06	Silver medal

== Snowboarding ==
The GB team had four competitors in the snowboarding events at the Olympics in 2006, with veteran competitor Lesley McKenna falling in both runs of the half pipe alongside first-time Olympians Kate Foster and Daniel Wakeham. First-time Olympian Zoe Gillings was the sole British competitor in the snowboardcross event which had its first Olympic appearance in 2006.

Wakeham finished 26th in men's halfpipe qualifying, missing the final. Gillings qualified 12th for the snowboard cross quarter-finals with a time of 1:31. She failed to progress further, being taken out of the heat following a collision with another rider and finished 15th.

Halfpipe

Athlete	Event	Qualifying run 1		Qualifying run 2		Final		
Athlete	Event	Points	Rank	Points	Rank	Run 1	Run 2	Rank
Kate Foster	Women's halfpipe	16.4	24	24.7	14	did not advance		20
Lesley McKenna	Women's halfpipe	1.4	34	5.2	27	did not advance		33
Daniel Wakeham	Men's halfpipe	14.3	35	27.8	20	did not advance		26

Note: In the final, the single best score from two runs is used to determine the ranking. A bracketed score indicates a run that wasn't counted.

Snowboard cross

Athlete	Event	Qualifying		1/8 finals	Quarterfinals	Semi-finals	Finals	
Athlete	Event	Time	Rank	Position	Position	Position	Position	Rank
Zoe Gillings	Women's snowboard cross	1:31.93	12 Q	n/a	4	did not advance	Classification 13–16; 3	15
