= Austria at the 2006 Winter Olympics =

- IOC code: AUT
- NOC: Austrian Olympic Committee
- Website: www.olympia.at (in German)

in Turin
- Competitors: 73 (55 men, 18 women) in 12 sports
- Flag bearer: Renate Götschl (opening)
- Medals Ranked 3rd: Gold 9 Silver 7 Bronze 7 Total 23

Winter Olympics appearances (overview)
- 1924; 1928; 1932; 1936; 1948; 1952; 1956; 1960; 1964; 1968; 1972; 1976; 1980; 1984; 1988; 1992; 1994; 1998; 2002; 2006; 2010; 2014; 2018; 2022; 2026

Austria competed at the 2006 Winter Olympics in Turin, Italy.

== Medalists ==
Medal	Name	Sport	Event	Date
Gold	Michaela Dorfmeister	Alpine skiing	Women's downhill	15 February
Gold	Andreas Linger; Wolfgang Linger	Luge	Doubles	15 February
Gold	Christoph Bieler; Felix Gottwald; Michael Gruber; Mario Stecher	Nordic combined	Team	16 February
Gold	Thomas Morgenstern	Ski jumping	Large hill	18 February
Gold	Michaela Dorfmeister	Alpine skiing	Women's super-G	20 February
Gold	Andreas Kofler; Martin Koch; Thomas Morgenstern; Andreas Widhölzl	Ski jumping	Team	20 February
Gold	Benjamin Raich	Alpine skiing	Men's giant slalom	20 February
Gold	Felix Gottwald	Nordic combined	Sprint	21 February
Gold	Benjamin Raich	Alpine skiing	Men's slalom	25 February
Silver	Felix Gottwald	Nordic combined	Men's individual	11 February
Silver	Michael Walchhofer	Alpine skiing	Men's downhill	12 February
Silver	Hermann Maier	Alpine skiing	Men's super-G	18 February
Silver	Marlies Schild	Alpine skiing	Women's combined	18 February
Silver	Andreas Kofler	Ski jumping	Large hill	18 February
Silver	Nicole Hosp	Alpine skiing	Women's slalom	22 February
Silver	Reinfried Herbst	Alpine skiing	Men's slalom	25 February
Bronze	Rainer Schönfelder	Alpine skiing	Men's combined	14 February
Bronze	Hermann Maier	Alpine skiing	Men's giant slalom	20 February
Bronze	Alexandra Meissnitzer	Alpine skiing	Women's super-G	20 February
Bronze	Marlies Schild	Alpine skiing	Women's slalom	22 February
Bronze	Siegfried Grabner	Snowboarding	Men's parallel giant slalom	22 February
Bronze	Rainer Schönfelder	Alpine skiing	Men's slalom	25 February
Bronze	Mikhail Botwinov	Cross-country skiing	Men's 50 km freestyle	26 February

== Alpine skiing ==
Men's

Athlete	Event	Final				
Athlete	Event	Run 1	Run 2	Run 3	Total	Rank
Stephan Görgl	Giant slalom	1:17.15	did not finish			
Christoph Gruber	Super-G	n/a			1:32.00	19
Reinfried Herbst	Slalom	53.55	50.42	n/a	1:43.97	Silver medal
Klaus Kröll	Downhill	n/a			1:50.91	22
Mario Matt	Slalom	did not finish				
Mario Matt	Combined	1:41.08	45.60	1:02.10	3:28.78	43
Hermann Maier	Downhill	n/a			1:50.00	6
Hermann Maier	Super-G	n/a			1:30.78	Silver medal
Hermann Maier	Giant slalom	1:16.83	1:18.33	n/a	2:35.16	Bronze medal
Benjamin Raich	Super-G	n/a			1:32.05	21
Benjamin Raich	Giant slalom	1:16.95	1:18.05	n/a	2:35.00	Gold medal
Benjamin Raich	Slalom	53.37	49.77	n/a	1:43.14	Gold medal
Benjamin Raich	Combined	1:40.42	44.23	did not finish		
Hannes Reichelt	Super-G	n/a			1:31.39	10
Rainer Schönfelder	Giant slalom	1:17.49	1:19.15	n/a	2:36.64	8
Rainer Schönfelder	Slalom	54.03	50.12	n/a	1:44.15	Bronze medal
Rainer Schönfelder	Combined	1:40.02	45.67	44.98	3:10.67	Bronze medal
Fritz Strobl	Downhill	n/a			1:50.12	8
Michael Walchhofer	Downhill	n/a			1:49.52	Silver medal
Michael Walchhofer	Combined	1:39.52	did not finish			

Women's

Athlete	Event	Final				
Athlete	Event	Run 1	Run 2	Run 3	Total	Rank
Michaela Dorfmeister	Downhill	n/a			1:56.49	Gold medal
Michaela Dorfmeister	Super-G	n/a			1:32.47	Gold medal
Andrea Fischbacher	Super-G	n/a			1:33.97	13
Elisabeth Görgl	Downhill	n/a			did not finish	
Renate Götschl	Downhill	n/a			1:57.20	4
Renate Götschl	Super-G	n/a			1:34.83	26
Nicole Hosp	Giant slalom	1:01.26	1:09.40	n/a	2:10.66	4
Nicole Hosp	Slalom	42.83	46.50	n/a	1:29.33	Silver medal
Nicole Hosp	Combined	38.75	43.32	1:31.14	2:53.21	5
Michaela Kirchgasser	Giant slalom	1:02.22	did not finish			
Michaela Kirchgasser	Slalom	42.97	47.31	n/a	1:30.28	5
Michaela Kirchgasser	Combined	38.99	43.47	1:31.02	2:53.48	6
Alexandra Meissnitzer	Downhill	n/a			1:57.78	8
Alexandra Meissnitzer	Super-G	n/a			1:33.06	Bronze medal
Marlies Schild	Giant slalom	1:02.68	1:10.59	n/a	2:13.27	17
Marlies Schild	Slalom	43.09	46.70	n/a	1:29.79	Bronze medal
Marlies Schild	Combined	38.39	42.83	1:30.36	2:51.58	Silver medal
Kathrin Zettel	Giant slalom	1:01.95	1:09.40	n/a	2:11.35	7
Kathrin Zettel	Slalom	disqualified				
Kathrin Zettel	Combined	38.77	42.98	1:30.66	2:52.41	4

Note: In the men's combined, run 1 is the downhill, and runs 2 and 3 are the slalom. In the women's combined, run 1 and 2 are the slalom, and run 3 the downhill.

== Biathlon ==
Both Wolfgang Perner and Wolfgang Rottmann had their results annulled and declared permanently ineligible after violations of the IOC Anti-doping Rules.

Athlete	Event	Final		
Athlete	Event	Time	Misses	Rank
Ludwig Gredler	Men's sprint	29:17.6	4	53
Ludwig Gredler	Men's pursuit	40:57.55	10	45
Ludwig Gredler	Men's individual	59:55.1	3	41
Daniel Mesotitsch	Men's individual	1:01:59.7	5	59
Wolfgang Perner	Men's sprint	disqualified		
Wolfgang Perner	Men's pursuit	disqualified		
Wolfgang Perner	Men's individual	disqualified		
Friedrich Pinter	Men's individual	58:25.7	1	26
Wolfgang Rottmann	Men's sprint	disqualified		
Wolfgang Rottmann	Men's pursuit	disqualified		
Christoph Sumann	Men's sprint	27:43.2	2	15
Christoph Sumann	Men's pursuit	36:39.70	2	7
Christoph Sumann	Men's mass start	48:17.4	2	9
Ludwig Gredler; Daniel Mesotitsch; Friedrich Pinter; Christoph Sumann	Men's relay	1:28:26.4	12	17

== Bobsleigh ==
Athlete	Event	Final					
Athlete	Event	Run 1	Run 2	Run 3	Run 4	Total	Rank
Wolfgang Stampfer; Klaus Seelos	Two-man	55.92	55.94	56.57	56.90	3:45.33	10
Jürgen Loacker; Gerhard Köhler	Two-man	56.29	56.22	57.07	57.69	3:47.27	13
Wolfgang Stampfer; Klaus Seelos; Jürgen Loacker; Hans Peter Welz	Four-man	55.77	55.83	55.73	55.53	3:42.86	13

== Cross-country skiing ==
Four cross-country skiers, Roland Diethart, Johannes Eder, Jürgen Pinter and Martin Tauber were permanently barred by the IOC for violations of the Anti-Doping Code, and their results were annulled.

Distance

Athlete	Event	Final	
Athlete	Event	Total	Rank
Mikhail Botwinov	Men's 30 km pursuit	1:17:08.5	7
Mikhail Botwinov	Men's 50 km freestyle	2:06:12.7	Bronze medal
Martin Tauber	Men's 15 km classical	Disqualified	
Martin Tauber	Men's 30 km pursuit	Disqualified	
Martin Tauber; Jürgen Pinter; Roland Diethart; Johannes Eder	Men's 4 x 10 km relay	Disqualified	

Sprint

Athlete	Event	Qualifying		Quarterfinal		Semifinal		Final	
Athlete	Event	Total	Rank	Total	Rank	Total	Rank	Total	Rank
Martin Stockinger	Men's sprint	2:20.18	25 Q	2:27.1	4	Did not advance			20
Harald Wurm	Men's sprint	2:20.11	24 Q	2:23.4	5	Did not advance			24
Johannes Eder; Jürgen Pinter	Men's team sprint	Disqualified							

== Figure skating ==
Athlete	Event	CD		SP/OD		FS/FD		Total	
Athlete	Event	Points	Rank	Points	Rank	Points	Rank	Points	Rank
Viktor Pfeifer	Men's	n/a		62.17	17 Q	101.70	23	163.87	22

Key: CD = Compulsory Dance, FD = Free Dance, FS = Free Skate, OD = Original Dance, SP = Short Program

== Freestyle skiing ==
Athlete	Event	Qualifying		Final	
Athlete	Event	Points	Rank	Points	Rank
Margarita Marbler	Women's moguls	24.15	6 Q	20.79	17

== Luge ==
Athlete	Event	Final					
Athlete	Event	Run 1	Run 2	Run 3	Run 4	Total	Rank
Veronika Halder	Women's singles	47.426	47.137	47.246	47.278	3:09.087	5
Markus Kleinheinz	Men's singles	52.140	51.767	51.841	51.839	3:27.587	9
Sonja Manzenreiter	Women's singles	47.308	47.200	did not finish			
Rainer Margreiter	Men's singles	52.200	51.880	52.234	51.800	3:28.114	12
Daniel Pfister	Men's singles	52.317	52.103	52.058	51.882	3:28.360	13
Nina Reithmayer	Women's singles	47.485	47.532	47.333	47.223	3:09.573	8
Andreas Linger; Wolfgang Linger	Doubles	47.028	47.469	n/a		1:34.497	Gold medal
Markus Schiegl; Tobias Schiegl	Doubles	47.108	47.843	n/a		1:34.951	4

== Nordic combined ==
Athlete	Event	Ski jumping		Cross-country		
Athlete	Event	Points	Rank	Deficit	Time	Rank
Christoph Bieler	Sprint	115.8	8	0:40	19:44.0 +1:15.0	23
Christoph Bieler	Individual Gundersen	251.0	5	0:46	41:51.3 +2:06.7	13
Felix Gottwald	Sprint	112.1	12	0:54	18:29.0	Gold medal
Felix Gottwald	Individual Gundersen	234.5	11	1:52	39:54.4 +0:09.8	Silver medal
Michael Gruber	Sprint	116.9	6	0:35	19:23.3 +0:54.3	13
Michael Gruber	Individual Gundersen	248.5	7	0:56	41:47.9 +2:03.3	12
Mario Stecher	Sprint	108.9	15	1:07	19:30.3 +1:01.3	14
Mario Stecher	Individual Gundersen	223.0	17	2:38	42:59.2 +3:14.6	19
Christoph Bieler; Felix Gottwald; Michael Gruber; Mario Stecher	Team	903.2	2	0:10	49:52.6	Gold medal

Note: 'Deficit' refers to the amount of time behind the leader a competitor began the cross-country portion of the event. Italicized numbers show the final deficit from the winner's finishing time.

== Skeleton ==
Athlete	Event	Final			
Athlete	Event	Run 1	Run 2	Total	Rank
Markus Penz	Men's	59.55	59.51	1:59.06	16
Martin Rettl	Men's	59.23	59.53	1:58.76	13

== Ski jumping ==
Athlete	Event	Qualifying		First round		Final		
Athlete	Event	Points	Rank	Points	Rank	Points	Total	Rank
Martin Koch	Normal hill	123.0	9 Q	118.0	24 Q	111.5	229.5	23
Martin Koch	Large hill	100.8	8 Q	94.8	32	did not advance		32
Andreas Kofler	Normal hill	134.5	1 PQ	127.0	11 Q	130.5	257.5	11
Andreas Kofler	Large hill	133.8	3 PQ	135.7	1 Q	141.1	276.8	Silver medal
Thomas Morgenstern	Normal hill	117.0	13 PQ	134.5	2 Q	125.0	259.5	9
Thomas Morgenstern	Large hill	136.8	1 PQ	131.4	2 Q	145.5	276.9	Gold medal
Andreas Widhölzl	Normal hill	129.0	6 PQ	120.5	20 Q	123.5	244.0	13
Andreas Widhölzl	Large hill	99.9	15 PQ	109.9	12 Q	100.2	210.1	21
Martin Koch; Andreas Kofler; Thomas Morgenstern; Andreas Widhölzl	Team	n/a		472.6	1 Q	511.4	984.0	Gold medal

Note: PQ indicates a skier was pre-qualified for the final, based on entry rankings.

== Snowboarding ==
Parallel GS

Men

Athlete	Event	Qualification		Round of 16	Quarterfinals	Semifinals	Finals	
Athlete	Event	Time	Rank	Opposition Time	Opposition Time	Opposition Time	Opposition Time	Rank
Siegfried Grabner	Parallel giant slalom	1:10.65	6 Q	Richardsson (SWE) (11); W -1.44 (-0.37 -1.07)	Inniger (SUI) (3); W -0.61 (-1.35 +0.74)	Schoch (SUI) (2); L +0.34 (+0.42 -0.08)	Bronze final Bozzetto (FRA) (13); W DNF (DNF +0.41)	Bronze medal
Alexander Maier	Parallel giant slalom	disqualified						
Andreas Prommegger	Parallel giant slalom	1:10.35	4 Q	Bozzetto (FRA) (13); L +0.54 (+0.48 +0.06)	did not advance			9
Harald Walder	Parallel giant slalom	1:12.11	14 Q	Inniger (SUI) (14); L +0.66 (+0.25 +0.41)	did not advance			14

Women

Athlete	Event	Qualification		Round of 16	Quarterfinals	Semifinals	Finals	
Athlete	Event	Time	Rank	Opposition Time	Opposition Time	Opposition Time	Opposition Time	Rank
Doris Günther	Parallel giant slalom	1:21.49	8 Q	Takeuchi (JPN) (9); W -0.24 (-0.10 -0.14)	Tudigescheva (RUS) (1); W -0.66 (-0.97 +0.31)	Kober (GER) (5); L +3.76 (+1.50 +2.26)	Bronze final Fletcher (USA) (13); L +0.69 (+1.50 -0.81)	4
Doresia Krings	Parallel giant slalom	1:22.02	11 Q	Meuli (SUI) (6); L +1.00 (+0.24 +0.76)	did not advance			11
Heidi Krings	Parallel giant slalom	1:21.79	10 Q	Bruhin (SUI) (7); L +2.06 (+0.06 +2.00)	did not advance			10
Manuela Riegler	Parallel giant slalom	1:31.72	28	did not advance				28

Key: '+ Time' represents a deficit; the brackets indicate the results of each run.

Snowboard cross

Athlete	Event	Qualifying		1/8 finals	Quarterfinals	Semifinals	Finals	
Athlete	Event	Time	Rank	Position	Position	Position	Position	Rank
Mario Fuchs	Men's snowboard cross	1:22.60	26 Q	3	did not advance			30
Lukas Grüner	Men's snowboard cross	1:21.28	11 Q	4	did not advance			19
Doris Günther	Women's snowboard cross	1:32.58	16 Q	n/a	4	did not advance	Classification 13–16; 2	14
Dieter Krassnig	Men's snowboard cross	1:21.00	6 Q	1 Q	2 Q	4	Small final 4	8
Doresia Krings	Women's snowboard cross	1:30.90	n/a	n/a	4	did not advance	Classification 13–16; 1	13
Hans Jörg Unterrainer	Men's snowboard cross	1:22.10	17 Q	1 Q	4	did not advance	Classification 13–16; 3	17

== Speed skating ==
Athlete	Event	Race 1		Final	
Athlete	Event	Time	Rank	Time	Rank
Anna Rokita	Women's 1500 m	n/a		2:20.19	27
Anna Rokita	Women's 3000 m	n/a		4:12.87	16
Anna Rokita	Women's 5000 m	n/a		7:16.75	12
