= Walter Mayer =

Austrian cross-country skier and coach (born 1957)

Walter Mayer (born March 17, 1957) is an Austrian cross-country skier and coach. He won the Vasaloppet in 1980, and finished second in 1992. As a coach, he was banned from the 2006 and 2010 Olympics after blood transfusion equipment was found in a house used by Austrian skiers during the 2002 Winter Olympics in Salt Lake City, Utah. Mayer was accused of blood doping violations and the International Olympic Committee (IOC) announced the ban after a three-month investigation.

At the 2006 Winter Olympics in Turin, Mayer—who had been spotted with the Austrian team despite his suspension—fled back to Austria after a surprise overnight raid on the quarters of the Austrian skiers by Italian police. He crashed his vehicle into a police roadblock, and was immediately relieved of his coaching duties by the Austrian Ski Federation. Police found syringes and a blood transfusion machine in the home where Mayer had been staying. Claiming that he was suicidal, Mayer entered a psychiatric hospital in Austria. In an interview with News, an Austrian magazine, Mayer said he was trying to kill himself when he drove into the police roadblock. He pleaded guilty to charges of civil disorder, assault, and damage to property.

In March 2006, Mayer filed defamation lawsuits against Dick Pound, head of the World Anti-Doping Agency, and Jacques Rogge, president of the IOC. He withdrew both suits in February 2007. The IOC held hearings in April 2007 on allegations of doping by Austrian skiers at the 2006 games. On April 25 the hearings closed, resulting in the lifetime suspensions of six Austrian skiers. Banned as a result of the hearings were biathletes Wolfgang Perner and Wolfgang Rottmann as well as cross country skiers Martin Tauber, Jürgen Pinter, Johannes Eder and Roland Diethart. While the six will be unable to compete in any capacity at any future Olympic event, the ban does not affect non-Olympic sporting events.

Mayer was arrested in Austria in March 2009 on suspicion of selling doping substances.
