= Martin Wright (bobsledder) =

British bobsledder

Martin Wright (born 23 June 1974 in Germany) is a British bobsledder who competed for Great Britain at the 2006 Winter Olympics.

At the 2006 Winter Olympics held in Turin, Italy, Wright competed in the men's four-man bobsleigh in a team that included brothers Karl and Lee Johnston. The British team finished in 17th position.
