= Nathan Cunningham =

Canadian bobsledder

Nathan Cunningham (born September 30, 1981) is a Canadian bobsledder.

Born in Calgary, Alberta, Cunningham began competing in bobsleigh in 2002, and joined the national team in 2003. His top finish on the World Cup circuit came in a two-man event in Innsbruck, when he teamed with driver Serge Despres to finish 12th.

Cunningham also competed at the 2006 Olympics in Turin. He was part of the Canada-2 crew in the Four-man event, along with Serge Despres, Steve Larsen and David Bissett. The team ended up in 18th place.
