= Nordic skiing at the 2006 Winter Olympics =

At the 2006 Winter Olympics, eighteen Nordic skiing events were contested – twelve cross-country skiing events, three ski jumping events, and three Nordic combined events.

Nordic skiing discipline	Men's events	Women's events
Cross-country skiing	• 1.35 km sprint	• 1.1 km sprint
Cross-country skiing	• Team sprint	• Team sprint
Cross-country skiing	• 15 km + 15 km pursuit	• 7.5 km + 7.5 km pursuit
Cross-country skiing	• 15 km (classical – interval start)	• 10 km (classical – interval start)
Cross-country skiing	• 50 km (freestyle – mass start)	• 30 km (freestyle – mass start)
Cross-country skiing	• 4 × 10 km relay	• 4 × 5 km relay
Ski jumping	• Large hill – individual	none
Ski jumping	• Normal hill – individual	none
Ski jumping	• Large hill – team	none
Nordic combined	• Individual	none
Nordic combined	• Sprint	none
Nordic combined	• Team	none
