= Antonio De Sanctis =

Italian bobsledder (born 1972)

Personal information
- Nationality: Italian
- Born: 18 October 1972 (age 52); Alessandria, Italy

Sport
- Sport: Bobsleigh

Antonio De Sanctis (born 18 October 1972) is an Italian bobsledder. He competed in the four man event at the 2006 Winter Olympics.
