= Alexei Seliverstov =

Russian bobsledder

Medal record

Bobsleigh

Olympic Games
Silver medal – second place	2006 Turin	Four-man

World Championships
Silver medal – second place	2005 Calgary	Four-man
Bronze medal – third place	2003 Lake Placid	Four-man

Alexei Nikolayevich Seliverstov (Russian: Алексей Николаевич Селиверстов) (sometimes listed as Aleksey Seliverstov, born July 24, 1976, in Ufa) is a Russian bobsledder who has competed since 1996. Competing in three Winter Olympics, he won the silver medal in the four-man event with teammates Philippe Egorov, Alexandre Zoubkov, and Alexey Voevoda at Turin in 2006.

Seliverstov also won two medals in the four-man event at the FIBT World Championships with a silver in 2005 and a bronze in 2003.

He participated in the torch relay for 2013 Summer Universiade in Kazan and the 2014 Winter Olympics in Sochi. He carried both torches through his hometown of Ufa, and lit the city cauldron outside the Ufa Arena with the Olympic torch.
