= Márcio Silva =

Márcio Silva may refer to:

- Márcio Silva (bobsledder) (born 1980), Brazilian bobsledder
- Márcio Silva (footballer) (born 2001), Brazilian football defender

== See also ==
- Márcio Carioca (born 1983), born Márcio Gesteira da Silva, Brazilian football striker
