= Radek Řechka =

Czech bobsledder

Personal information
- Nationality: Czech
- Born: 12 November 1975 (age 49); Příbram, Czechoslovakia

Sport
- Sport: Bobsleigh

Radek Řechka (born 12 November 1975) is a Czech bobsledder. He competed in the four man event at the 2006 Winter Olympics.
