= Alek Osmanović =

Croatian bobsledder

Personal information
- Nationality: Croatian
- Born: 30 November 1982 (age 42); Makarska, SR Croatia, SFR Yugoslavia

Sport
- Sport: Bobsleigh

Alek Osmanović (born 30 November 1982) is a Croatian bobsledder. He competed in the four man event at the 2006 Winter Olympics.
