= Arno Klaassen =

Dutch bobsledder (born 1979)

Arno Klaassen (born 16 November 1979 in Tilburg) is a Dutch bobsledder. Klaassen started with international bobsleigh competitions in 2005 and therefore was not yet part of Arend Glas's team that participated at the 2002 Winter Olympics in Salt Lake City. However, from 2005 on his skills improved fast and he became a regular member of the 4-bob. In January 2006 Klaassen qualified himself in the team of that several weeks earlier secured its qualification for the 2006 Winter Olympics in Turin. At the qualification play-off (named bob-off) held in Oberhof, Germany, he ended up in second position (behind Sybren Jansma), thus claiming his seat in the bob. Together with Glas, Jansma and Vincent Kortbeek he became 16th.
