= Māris Bogdanovs =

Latvian bobsledder (born 1979)

Personal information
- Nationality: Latvian
- Born: 7 May 1979 (age 45); Limbaži, Latvia
- Height: 186 cm (6 ft 1 in)
- Weight: 92 kg (203 lb)

Sport
- Sport: Bobsleigh

Māris Bogdanovs (born 7 May 1979) is a Latvian bobsledder. He competed in the four man event at the 2006 Winter Olympics.
