= Pierre-Alain Menneron =

French bobsledder

Personal information
- Nationality: French
- Born: 6 April 1975 (age 49); Lyon, France

Sport
- Sport: Bobsleigh

Pierre-Alain Menneron (born 6 April 1975) is a French bobsledder. He competed in the four man event at the 2006 Winter Olympics.
