= Karl Johnston (bobsleigh) =

English bobsledder

Karl George Johnston (born 26 February 1979 in Whitby, North Yorkshire) is an English bobsledder who competed for Great Britain at the 2006 Winter Olympics.

At the 2006 Winter Olympics held in Turin, Italy, Johnston competed in the men's four-man bobsleigh event as part of a team that included his brother Lee Johnston. The British team finished in 17th position.
