= Sybren Jansma =

Dutch bobsledder

Sybren Jansma (born 3 February 1982 in Drachten) is a Dutch bobsledder. Jansma started with international bobsleigh competitions in the 2002 and was not yet part of Arend Glas's team that participated at the 2002 Winter Olympics in Salt Lake City. However, Jansma developed himself to become Glas's main compatriot in the years to follow in both the 2-bob as the 4-bob. In January 2006 Jansma qualified himself in the team of that several weeks earlier secured its qualification for the 2006 Winter Olympics in Turin. At the qualification play-off (named bob-off) held in Oberhof, Germany, he ended up in first position claiming his seat in both possible bobs. Together with Glas he became 19th after four runs in the 2-bob, while with Glas, Vincent Kortbeek and Arno Klaassen the 16th position was reached.

At the 2010 Winter Olympics in Vancouver, Jansma finished 14th in the two-man event.

His best finish at the FIBT World Championships was seventh in the four-man event at Lake Placid, New York, in 2009. His best World Cup finish was third in a two-man event at St. Moritz in January 2010.
