= Alexandre Vanhoutte =

French bobsledder

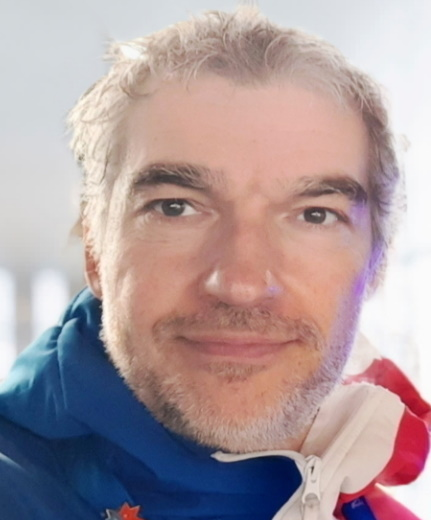

Personal information
- Nationality: French
- Born: 18 July 1974 (age 50); Croix, France

Sport
- Sport: Bobsleigh

Alexandre Vanhoutte (born 18 July 1974) is a French bobsledder. He competed in the four man event at the 2006 Winter Olympics.
