= Vincent Kortbeek =

Dutch bobsledder (born 1982)

Vincent Kortbeek (born 19 November 1982 in Vught) is a Dutch bobsledder. Kortbeek started with international bobsleigh competitions in 2003 and therefore was not yet part of Arend Glas's team that participated at the 2002 Winter Olympics in Salt Lake City. However, from 2003 on his skills improved fast and he became a regular member of the 4-bob. In January 2006 Kortbeek qualified himself in the team of that several weeks earlier secured its qualification for the 2006 Winter Olympics in Turin. At the qualification play-off (named bob-off) held in Oberhof, Germany, he ended up in third position (behind Sybren Jansma and Arno Klaassen claiming his seat in the bob. Together with Glas, Jansma and Klaassen he became 16th. His brother Thomas Kortbeek is an athlete.
