= Luca Ottolino =

Italian bobsledder (born 1978)

Personal information
- Nationality: Italian
- Born: 26 August 1978 (age 46); Bari, Italy

Sport
- Sport: Bobsleigh

Luca Ottolino (born 26 August 1978) is an Italian bobsledder. He competed in the four man event at the 2006 Winter Olympics.
