= Filipp Yegorov =

Russian bobsledder (born 1978)

Personal information
- Born: June 8, 1978 (age 48)
Medal record
Bobsleigh
Representing Russia
Olympic Games
Silver medal – second place	2006 Turin	Four-man
European Championships
Silver medal – second place	2012 Altenberg	Four-man
Silver medal – second place	2011 Winterberg	Four-man

Filipp Yevgenyevich Yegorov (Russian: Филипп Евгеньевич Егоров; born June 8, 1978) is a Russian bobsledder who has competed since 2000. Competing in three Winter Olympics, he won the silver medal in the four-man event at Turin in 2006 with his teammates Alexandr Zubkov, Alexei Seliverstov, and Alexey Voyevoda. He was also a member of the four-man crew which won silver medals at the Bobsleigh European Championship in 2011 and 2012.
