= Leuzinger =

Leuzinger and its diaspora variant Leutzinger is a Swiss German habitational surname denoting a person originally living in the Swiss hamlet of Leuzingen in the former municipality of Netstal in the Canton of Glarus and may refer to:

- Bruno Leuzinger (1886–1952), Swiss ice hockey player
- Franz Keller-Leuzinger (1835–1890), German explorer, painter, writer, illustrator and engineer
- George Leuzinger (1813–1892), Swiss Brazilian photographer
- James Leuzinger (born 1982), Swiss born British alpine skier
- Rudolf Leuzinger (1826–1896), Swiss cartographer
