= Lorenzo Smith III =

American bobsledder

Lorenzo Smith III (born February 27, 1978) is an American bobsledder who competed from 2002 to 2006. He finished sixth in the four-man event at the 2006 Winter Olympics in Turin. Smith also finished eighth in the four-man event at the 2005 FIBT World Championships in Calgary. A native of Kankakee, Illinois, Smith graduated from the United States Military Academy in West Point, New York in 2000. While at West Point, he reached the top ten events in three track and field events: 60 m, 100 m, and the 4 × 100 m relay. The 4 × 100 m relay record was set during the 2000 outdoor athletic season. Smith also won two sprinting championships in the Patriot League while at West Point. Smith served in South Korea from 2001 to 2003 in air defense. Smith serves in the United States Army as a captain. He was honored by the Illinois General Assembly for his participation in the 2006 Winter Olympics.
