= Kate Foster (snowboarder) =

British snowboarder

Personal information
- Nationality: British
- Born: 16 August 1985 (age 40) Toronto, Ontario, Canada

Sport
- Sport: Snowboarding

Kate Foster (born 16 August 1985) is a British snowboarder. She has won the British half-pipe championship three times and she competed in the women's halfpipe event at the 2006 Winter Olympics.

== Life ==
Foster was born in Canada and her brother James Foster is also a snowboarder and coach.

She competed in the women's halfpipe event at the 2006 Winter Olympics.

In 2011 she won the British Halfpipe Championship for the third time. She also gained a silver at snowboardcross at the same event.
