= Christoph Heyder =

German bobsledder (born 1974)

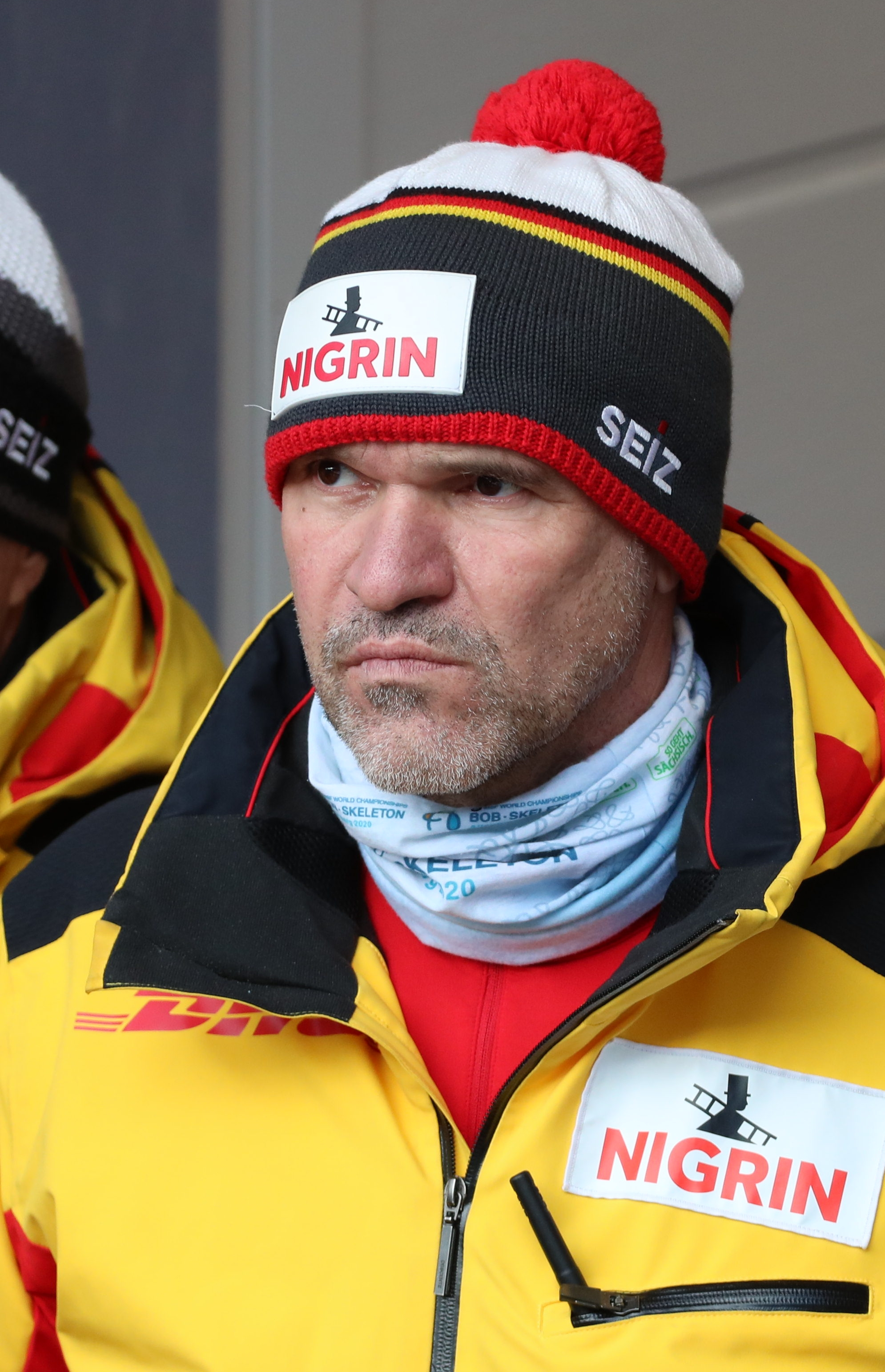

Personal information
- Nationality: German
- Born: 3 June 1974 (age 52) Suhl, Thuringia, East Germany
- Height: 1.95 m (6 ft 5 in)
- Weight: 109 kg (240 lb; 17.2 st)

Sport
- Country: Germany
- Sport: Bobsleigh
Medal record
Men's Bobsleigh
Representing Germany
World Championships
Silver medal – second place	2004 Königssee	Four-man

Christoph Heyder (born 3 June 1974 in Suhl) is a German bobsledder who has competed since 1997. He won a silver medal in the four-man event at the 2004 FIBT World Championships in Königssee.

Heyder also finished fifth in the four-man event at the 2006 Winter Olympics in Turin.

Before his bobsledding career, Heyder was a javelin thrower. As of 2012, Heyder is a sport of athletics coach.
