= Roger Cruickshank =

- Born: 18 October 1982 (age 43); Banchory, Aberdeenshire, Scotland
- Occupations: Pilot, skier

Roger Cruickshank DFC (born 18 October 1982) is a Scottish pilot in the Royal Air Force, a Squadron Leader, and one of United Kingdom's top downhill skiers.

== Early life ==
Roger Cruickshank was born on 18 October 1982 in Banchory, Aberdeenshire, Scotland.

== Career ==
Cruickshank joined the Royal Air Force, where he serves as a Eurofighter Typhoon pilot. He served in Iraq in 2016. He was awarded the Distinguished Flying Cross in 2017.

In March 2005, Cruickshank crashed whilst skiing, which shattered his left tibia and required a metal plate with nine pins to be permanently fixed in his leg. After regaining the ability to walk in June 2005, he qualified for the 2006 Winter Olympics in Turin. In the Men's Downhill event, skiing with a knee-brace, Cruickshank finished 37th.

Cruickshank is the co-author of Speed of Sound, Sound of Mind in 2016.

== Personal life ==
Cruickshank lost his mother to depression after she committed suicide in 2010.

== Honours ==
- 2017 : Distinguished Flying Cross.

== Works ==
- Cruickshank, Roger; MacNaughton, Don (2016). Speed of Sound, Sound of Mind: A remarkable story of mind power, metal and making dreams come true. Tain, U.K.: Headshrink Publications.
