= Andreas Gees =

Swiss bobsledder (born 1975)

Andreas "Andi" Gees (born 1 June 1975) is a Swiss bobsledder who competed from 1999 to 2006. He earned two Bobsleigh World Cup victories in the four-man event (December 2004 - Cortina d'Ampezzo, January 2005 - Cesana Pariol).

Gees also finished fourth in the four-man event at the 2005 FIBT World Championships in Calgary. He finished eighth in the four-man event at the 2006 Winter Olympics in Turin.
