= Dan Wakeham =

British snowboarder

Dan Wakeham (born 12 November 1981 in Plymouth, England) is a British professional snowboarder.

Wakeham started snowboarding on Plymouth dry ski slope when he was 14. He was sponsored by Santa Cruz Snowboards by the age of 15. When leaving school at the age of 17 Wakeham spent his first season in Flaine, France where he worked as a shaper in the snowboard park. In 2003 a decision was made to join the GB team and set his target to compete in the 2006 Winter Olympics. In 2004 Wakeham signed a pro deal Nike ACG. In 2006 Wakeham was the first British male to compete in Olympic snowboarding in Turin, Italy.

Wakeham made the decision to retire before the Vancouver Olympics.
