= Hans-Peter Welz =

Austrian bobsledder

Personal information
- Nationality: Austrian
- Born: 8 January 1976 (age 50) Kufstein, Austria

Sport
- Sport: Bobsleigh

Achievements and titles
- Olympic finals: 2006 Winter Olympics

Hans-Peter Welz (born 8 January 1976) is an Austrian bobsledder. He competed in the four man event at the 2006 Winter Olympics.
