= Márcio Silva (bobsledder) =

Brazilian bobsledder

Personal information
- Born: 2 July 1980 (age 44); São Paulo, Brazil

Sport
- Sport: Bobsleigh

Márcio Silva (born 2 July 1980) is a Brazilian bobsledder. He competed in the four man event at the 2006 Winter Olympics.
