= Roland Diethart =

Austrian cross-country skier (born 1973)

Personal information
- Nationality: Austrian
- Born: 3 August 1973 (age 51); Leoben, Austria

Sport
- Sport: Cross-country skiing

Roland Diethart (born 3 August 1973) is an Austrian former cross-country skier. He competed in the men's relay event at the 2006 Winter Olympics.
