= Mark Hatton (luger) =

British luger (born 1973)

Mark Hatton (born 28 March 1973) is a British luge coach and former luger who competed from 1997 to 2007, including two Winter Olympic Games: Salt Lake City 2002 and Torino 2006. He finished in 25th place in the singles event at the 2002 Games, the highest placed sledder without a track in their home country.

Hatton's first competitive sport was athletics, specifically pole vaulting. He attended Brunel University London, where he graduated with a degree in sports science, and St John's College, Cambridge, where he completed a Postgraduate Certificate in Education and earned a double blue in athletics and ice hockey, following in the footsteps of his father, who attended the same college and earned two blues in tennis. Mark also spent some years playing rugby in Japan. He first tried luge on a week-long course in Austria in 1993.

Hatton's best finish at the Luge World Cup was 18th in the men's singles event at Igls in 2006. After retiring from competition in 2007, Hatton served as Luge Event Manager for the Organising Committee of the 2010 Winter Olympics in Vancouver for three years, before becoming Performance Director for the Great Britain luge team and joining the board of the British Columbia Luge Association. He was subsequently appointed as National Team Coach for the South Korean luge team at the 2018 Winter Olympics in Pyongchang.
