= James Leuzinger =

British alpine skier (born 1982)

Personal information
- Nationality: British
- Born: 5 May 1982 (age 42); Glarus, Switzerland

Sport
- Sport: Alpine skiing

James Leuzinger (born 5 May 1982) is a British alpine skier. He competed in the men's slalom at the 2006 Winter Olympics.

== Personal life ==
Leuzinger was born in Switzerland to a British mother. He is the nephew of former England rugby player Peter Winterbottom.
