= Ski jumping at the 2006 Winter Olympics =

Ski Jumping at the XX Olympic Winter Games
- Venue: Pragelato
- Dates: 11–20 February 2006
- Competitors: 79 from 21 nations

Ski jumping at the 2006 Winter Olympics, was held over nine days, from 11 February to 20 February. Three events were contested in Pragelato.

== Medal summary ==
=== Medal table ===
Rank	Nation	Gold	Silver	Bronze	Total
1	Austria	2	1	0	3
2	Norway	1	0	3	4
3	Finland	0	2	0	2
Totals (3 entries)		3	3	3	9

=== Events ===
Event	Gold		Silver		Bronze	
Normal hill individual	Lars Bystøl; Norway	266.5	Matti Hautamäki; Finland	265.5	Roar Ljøkelsøy; Norway	264.5
Large hill individual	Thomas Morgenstern; Austria	276.9	Andreas Kofler; Austria	276.8	Lars Bystøl; Norway	250.7
Large hill team	Austria; Andreas Widhölzl; Andreas Kofler; Martin Koch; Thomas Morgenstern	984.0	Finland; Tami Kiuru; Janne Happonen; Janne Ahonen; Matti Hautamäki	976.6	Norway; Lars Bystøl; Bjørn Einar Romøren; Tommy Ingebrigtsen; Roar Ljøkelsøy	950.1

== Participating NOCs ==
Twenty-one nations participated in ski jumping at Torino.

- Austria (4)
- Belarus (2)
- Bulgaria (2)
- Canada (4)
- China (4)
- Czech Republic (5)
- Estonia (2)
- Finland (5)
- Germany (5)
- Italy (4)
- Japan (5)
- Kazakhstan (4)
- South Korea (4)
- Norway (5)
- Poland (5)
- Russia (4)
- Slovakia (1)
- Slovenia (4)
- Switzerland (4)
- Ukraine (1)
- United States (5)
