= Steve Larsen =

Canadian bobsledder (born 1975)

Steve Larsen (born July 26, 1975) is a Canadian bobsleigher who competed in the 2006 Winter Olympics. Larsen grew up in Burnaby, British Columbia.
