= Dan Humphries =

British-Canadian bobsledder (born 1979)

Dan Humphries (born 27 August 1979 in Newport, Wales) is a former bobsledder for Team GB and Canada. He was a member of the Royal Air Force and competed for Great Britain at the 2006 Winter Olympics sponsored by the RAF.

He won the World Cup four-man event at Park City, Utah on 14 November 2009. He retired from the sport after the 2010 Winter Olympics.
