= Klaus Seelos =

Austrian bobsledder

Personal information
- Nationality: Austrian
- Born: 10 September 1969 (age 56) Zams, Austria

Sport
- Sport: Bobsleigh

Klaus Seelos (born 10 September 1969) is an Austrian bobsledder. He competed at the 2002 Winter Olympics and the 2006 Winter Olympics.
