= Serge Despres =

Canadian bobsledder

Serge Despres (born February 28, 1978) is a Canadian bobsledder from Cocagne, New Brunswick who competed from 2000 to 2006. At the 2006 Winter Olympics in Turin, he finished 11th in the two-man event and 18th in the four-man event.
