= Jürgen Pinter =

Austrian cross-country skier

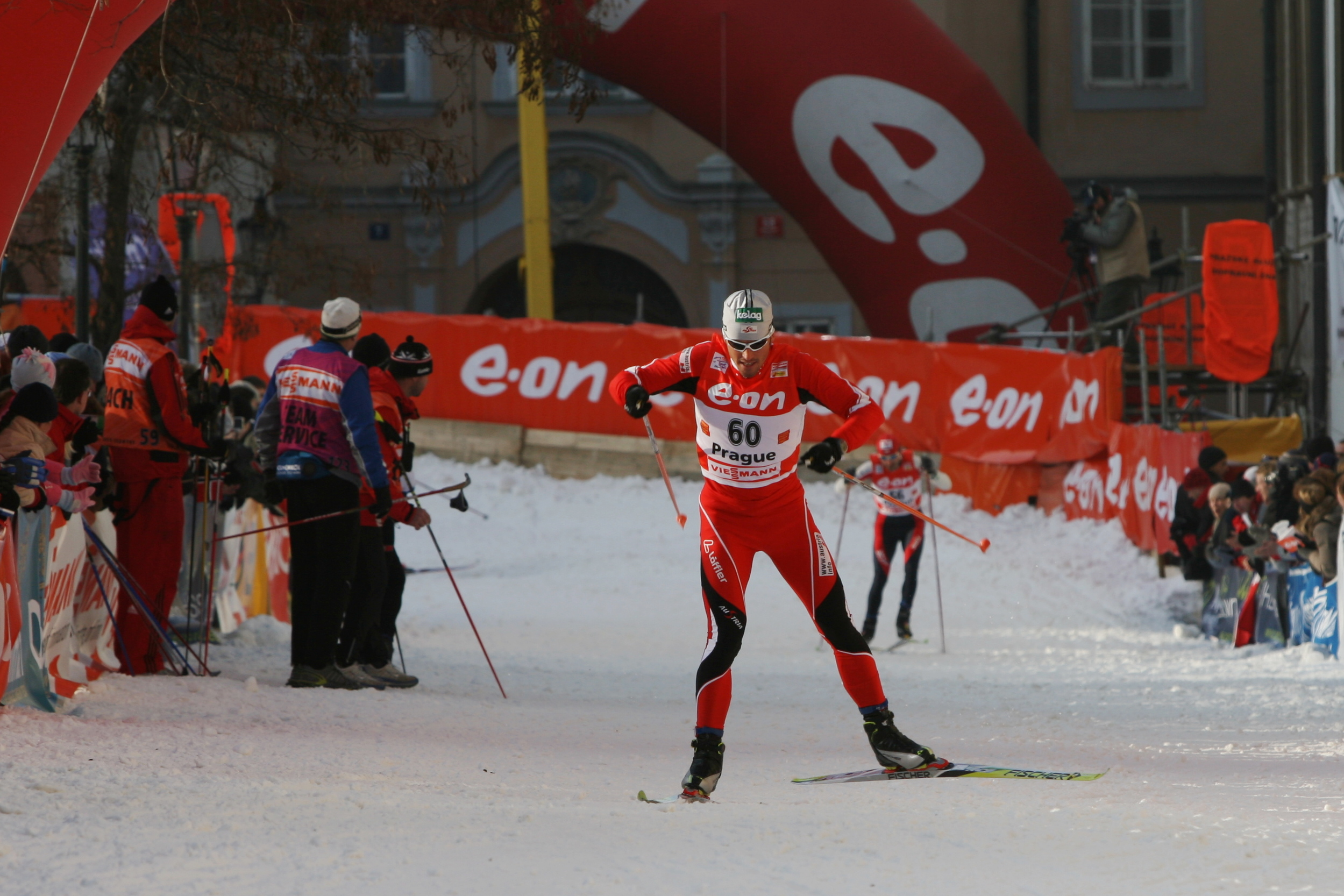
- Pinter in 2007

Personal information
- Nationality: Austria
- Born: 30 March 1979 (age 47) Villach, Austria

Sport
- Sport: Skiing
- Club: Union Köstenberg

World Cup career
- Seasons: 1999–2008, 2011
- Indiv. starts: 49
- Indiv. podiums: 0
- Team starts: 6
- Team podiums: 0
- Overall titles: 0 – (86th in 2002)
- Discipline titles: 0

Jürgen Pinter (born 30 March 1979 in Villach) is an Austrian cross-country skier. He competed in cross-country skiing at the 2006 Winter Olympics in Turin. He participated at the FIS Nordic World Ski Championships 2011. In November 2008 he was handed a four-year ban from sports for doping.

== Doping scandal in Turin ==
Pinter was banned by the International Olympic Committee (IOC) for life from the Olympic Games for his involvement in a doping scandal at the 2006 Winter Olympics in Turin. The International Ski Federation (FIS) cleared him in their anti-doping hearing of the case while three other Austrian cross-country skiers were handed doping bans. The World Anti-Doping Agency (WADA) appealed Pinters case to the Court of Arbitration for Sport (CAS), and in November 2008 he was handed a four-year ban from sports.

== Olympic results ==
| Year | Age | 15 km individual | 30 km skiathlon | 50 km mass start | Sprint | 4 × 10 km relay | Team sprint |
|---|---|---|---|---|---|---|---|
| 2006 | 26 | — | — | — | — | DSQ | DSQ |

== World Championship results ==
| Year | Age | 15 km individual | 30 km skiathlon | 50 km mass start | Sprint | 4 × 10 km relay | Team sprint |
|---|---|---|---|---|---|---|---|
| 2007 | 27 | DSQ | — | DSQ | — | DSQ | DSQ |
| 2011 | 31 | — | 40 | 47 | — | — | — |

== World Cup results ==
All results are sourced from the International Ski Federation (FIS).

=== World Cup standings ===
| Season | Age | Season standings | | | | | Ski Tour standings | | |
| Season | Age | Overall | Distance | Long Distance | Middle Distance | Sprint | Nordic Opening | Tour de Ski | World Cup Final |
|---|---|---|---|---|---|---|---|---|---|
| 1999 | 20 | NC | —N/a | NC | —N/a | NC | —N/a | —N/a | —N/a |
| 2000 | 21 | NC | —N/a | DNP | NC | NC | —N/a | —N/a | —N/a |
| 2001 | 22 | NC | —N/a | —N/a | —N/a | DNP | —N/a | —N/a | —N/a |
| 2002 | 23 | 86 | —N/a | —N/a | —N/a | NC | —N/a | —N/a | —N/a |
| 2003 | 24 | NC | —N/a | —N/a | —N/a | NC | —N/a | —N/a | —N/a |
| 2004 | 25 | NC | NC | —N/a | —N/a | DNP | —N/a | —N/a | —N/a |
| 2005 | 26 | NC | NC | —N/a | —N/a | DNP | —N/a | —N/a | —N/a |
| 2006 | 27 | 155 | 113 | —N/a | —N/a | DNP | —N/a | —N/a | —N/a |
| 2007 | 28 | DSQ | DSQ | —N/a | —N/a | DSQ | —N/a | DSQ | —N/a |
| 2008 | 29 | DSQ | DSQ | —N/a | —N/a | DSQ | —N/a | DSQ | DNP |
| 2011 | 32 | NC | NC | —N/a | —N/a | NC | DNP | DNF | DNP |
