= Martin Tauber =

Austrian cross-country skier

Personal information
- Nationality: Austrian
- Born: 4 November 1976 (age 48); Innsbruck, Austria

Sport
- Sport: Cross-country skiing

Martin Tauber (born 4 November 1976) is a former Austrian cross-country skier. He competed in the men's 15 kilometre classical event at the 2006 Winter Olympics.

== Doping scandal in Turin ==
In April 2007 Tauber was banned for life by the International Olympic Committee (IOC) from competing in any Olympic Games for doping at the 2006 Winter Olympics in Turin.
