= Arend Glas =

Dutch bobsledder

Arend Dirk Glas (29 October 1968) is a Dutch bobsledder who has competed between 1992 and 2006.

== Career ==
Glas began his career in bobsledding in 1992 in Igls, Innsbruck in Austria. Competing in two Winter Olympic Games, he achieved his best finishing position of 16th both in the two-man event at Salt Lake City in 2002 and in the four-man event at Turin in 2006.

At the IBSF World Championships, Glas earned his best finish position of 12th in the two-man event at St. Moritz in the FIBT World Championships 2001. His best results in four-man were 4th in the European Championships in Cortina d'Ampezzo in 2001, and 5th in the overall world ranking of the 2001–2002 season. Glas retired after the 2006 Winter Olympics.

== Personal life ==
Glas holds a doctorandus degree in business economics and is the manager of Bobsleigh Support & Bobstart. On 13 October 2019, Glas's partner, Bea Hekhuis, died of breast cancer.

=== Controversy ===
During his 2002 Olympic qualification, Glas gained media attention when a 1998 accusation by anti-fascist research group Kafka resurfaced of his alleged membership of the far-right Centre Party '86. Faced with public scrutiny, Glas distanced himself from right-wing extremism. In the run-up to the 2021 Dutch general election, however, he expressed support for the far-right Forum for Democracy following a scuffle with anti-fascist counter-protesters at a campaign rally in Groningen.
