= Lee Johnston (bobsleigh) =

English bobsledder (born 1972)

Lee Johnston (born 16 June 1972) is an English bobsledder who debuted in 1995. Competing in three Winter Olympics (1998, 2002, 2006), he earned his best finish of tenth in the two-man event at Salt Lake City in 2002.

== Career ==
Johnston also finished fifth in the four-man event at the 2007 FIBT World Championships in St. Moritz.

Johnston's brother, Karl, was a crewman for the event. Both brothers come from Whitby, in North Yorkshire.

Johnston and his crew were not selected for the squad at the 2010 Winter Olympics in Vancouver, despite winning the trial races in Germany and Switzerland in 2009.

Johnston has competed in over 10 world championships, three Olympic games, over 60 World Cup Races, and he is a 12-time British champion.

Johnston finished his competitive career in 2010. Having not been selected for Vancouver 2010, he then became a development coach for the British Bobsleigh team with his focus being on the first Youth Olympic Games in Innsbruck 2012 where the Team of Mica McNeil and Jazmin Sawyers finished in Silver medal position.

Johnston then assisted at all levels over the next 4 years from senior and Junior World Championships and then assisting with the coaching team for John Jackson and his team to a bronze medal in Sochi 2014 in the four-man event.

He had the pleasure of coaching his oldest son, George Johnston, along with five other talented athletes, while doing the second Youth Olympics. This program had huge success finishing before the Youth games ranked 1 -2 - 3 in the females and 1 -3 - 4 in the males in their series of races. Kelsea Purchall, the number one ranked female in the world heading into the 2016 Lillehammer Youth Olympics, finished in 3rd Bronze medal position, and George Johnston, the number one ranked male in the world at the time, finished 6th.

He also coached Mica McNeil and Mica Moore to a gold medal in Winterberg at the Junior World Championships in 2017

Johnston was made the head coach in September 2017, 22 weeks before the Pyeongchang Olympic games where Mica McNeil and Mica Moore also finished the Olympics with the best ever female result- after having their funding removed earlier that year.

Johnston has been the head coach from 2017 to 2019, but over those two seasons on the World Cup, Lamin Deen, Brad Hall, and Mica McNeil have all gained their best results with their teams.

Due to funding, Johnston was released by British Bobsleigh in July 2019 but was re-employed in October as a Consultant Coach and Manager, hoping to carry on the work that has already been done with the senior three pilots.

On a side note, his youngest son has been selected for the 3rd Youth Programme, making him the fourth member of the Johnston family to represent Great Britain.
