= 2006 Winter Olympics =

Multi-sport event in Turin, Italy

XX Olympic Winter Games
- Emblem of the 2006 Winter Olympics
- Location: Turin, Italy
- Motto: Passion Lives Here (Italian: La passione vive qui)
- Nations: 80
- Athletes: 2,563 (1,608 men and 955 women)
- Events: 84 in 7 sports (15 disciplines)
- Opening: 10 February 2006
- Closing: 26 February 2006
- Opened by: President Carlo Azeglio Ciampi
- Closed by: IOC President Jacques Rogge
- Cauldron: Stefania Belmondo
- Stadium: Stadio Olimpico Grande Torino

The 2006 Winter Olympics (Italian: 2006 Olimpiadi invernali), officially the XX Olympic Winter Games (Italian: XX Giochi olimpici invernali) and also known as Torino 2006, were a winter multi-sport event held from 10 to 26 February in Turin, Italy. Turin was selected as the host city for the 2006 Games in June 1999.

This marked the second time Italy had hosted the Winter Olympics, the first being in 1956 in Cortina d'Ampezzo, and the third would be the 2026 Winter Olympics in Milan and Cortina d'Ampezzo which was 20 years after the 2006 event. Italy had also hosted the Summer Olympics in 1960 in Rome.

== Host city selection ==
In a surprising way, Turin was chosen as the host of the Olympics at the 109th IOC Session in Seoul, South Korea on 19 June 1999. This decision was the first bidding process, after the IOC had adopted new election procedures during the 108th Extraordinary IOC Session in light of the controversies surrounding the votes for the 1998 and 2002 Winter Olympics.

Since IOC members were forbidden from visiting the candidate cities (in the interests of reducing bribery), the 109th IOC Session elected a special body, the Selection College, to choose finalist cities from the pool of candidate cities after each had made their final presentations to the full IOC Session.

The full IOC Session then voted on the cities chosen as finalist cities by the Selection College. Although six European cities presented their projects. Only two would advance to the final stage, which was the choice of the host city. At the first phase, all had to make the preliminary presentation in full IOC Session. All the members of the Selection College had to be present at the audience and it was their responsibility to decide which would be the two finalists. They decided that the cities were: the big favorite Sion and the dark horse of the process: Turin. The bids of Helsinki, Finland; Poprad-Tatry, Slovakia; Zakopane, Poland; and Klagenfurt, Austria were dropped by the Selection College after all six bidding cities made their presentations.

The selection of Turin over Sion came as a surprise around the world since the Swiss city was seen as the overwhelming favorite in part because the IOC had their headquarters in Switzerland. Some analysts attribute the choice of Turin as a reaction to Swiss IOC member Marc Hodler's role in exposing the bribery scandal surrounding Salt Lake City's bid for the 2002 Winter Olympics.

The information below comes from the International Olympic Committee Vote History web page.

2006 Winter Olympics bidding results
| City | Country | Round 1 |
| Turin | Italy | 53 |
| Sion | Switzerland | 36 |

== Cost and cost overrun ==
The Oxford Olympics Study established the outturn cost of the Torino 2006 Winter Olympics at US$4.4 billion in 2015-dollars and cost overrun at 80% in real terms. This includes sports-related costs only, that is, (i) operational costs incurred by the organizing committee for the purpose of staging the Games, e.g., expenditures for technology, transportation, workforce, administration, security, catering, ceremonies, and medical services, and (ii) direct capital costs incurred by the host city and country or private investors to build, e.g., the competition venues, the Olympic village, international broadcast center, and media and press center, which are required to host the Games. Indirect capital costs are not included, such as for road, rail, or airport infrastructure, or for hotel upgrades or other business investment incurred in preparation for the Games but not directly related to staging the Games. The cost and cost overrun for Torino 2006 compares with costs of US$2.5 billion and a cost overrun of 13% for Vancouver 2010, and costs of US$51 billion and a cost overrun of 289% for Sochi 2014, the latter being the most costly Olympics to date. Average cost for Winter Games since 1960 is US$3.1 billion, average cost overrun is 142%.

== Sports ==
The 2006 Winter Olympics featured 84 medal events over 15 disciplines in 7 sports. Unlike the previous four editions of the Winter Games, no new sport/discipline was introduced. Eight new events were added in disciplines already on the Olympic program, including mass start in biathlon, team sprint in cross-country skiing, boarder cross in snowboard, and team pursuit in speed skating, all with both men's and women's competitions. The International Ski Federation introduced an alternating system for cross-country skiing styles in certain events. Long-distance races (30 km for women and 50 km for men) that were contested in the classic style during the 2002 Winter Olympics were freestyle events in Torino.

The sports and disciplines that were contested at the 2006 Games:

- Alpine skiing (10)
- Biathlon (10)
- Bobsleigh (3)
- Cross-country skiing (12)
- Curling (2)
- Figure skating (4)
- Freestyle skiing (4)
- Ice hockey (2)
- Luge (3)
- Nordic combined (3)
- Short track speed skating (8)
- Skeleton (2)
- Ski jumping (3)
- Snowboarding (6)
- Speed skating (12)

Numbers in parentheses indicate the number of medal events contested in each separate discipline.

== Calendar ==
All dates are in Central European Time (UTC+1)

| OC | Opening ceremony | ● | Event competitions | 1 | Event finals | EG | Exhibition gala | CC | Closing ceremony |

| February | 10th Fri | 11th Sat | 12th Sun | 13th Mon | 14th Tue | 15th Wed | 16th Thu | 17th Fri | 18th Sat | 19th Sun | 20th Mon | 21st Tue | 22nd Wed | 23rd Thu | 24th Fri | 25th Sat | 26th Sun | Events |
|---|---|---|---|---|---|---|---|---|---|---|---|---|---|---|---|---|---|---|
| Ceremonies | OC | | | | | | | | | | | | | | | | CC | |
| Alpine skiing | | | 1 | | 1 | 1 | | ● | 2 | | 2 | | 1 | | 1 | 1 | | 10 |
| Biathlon | | 1 | | 1 | 1 | | 1 | | 2 | | | 1 | | 1 | | 2 | | 10 |
| Bobsleigh | | | | | | | | | ● | 1 | ● | 1 | | | | ● | 1 | 3 |
| Cross country skiing | | | 2 | | 2 | | 1 | 1 | 1 | 1 | | | 2 | | 1 | | 1 | 12 |
| Curling | | | | ● | ● | ● | ● | ● | ● | ● | ● | | ● | 1 | 1 | | | 2 |
| Figure skating | | ● | | 1 | ● | | 1 | ● | | ● | 1 | ● | | 1 | EG | | | 4 |
| Freestyle skiing | | 1 | | | | 1 | | | | | ● | ● | 1 | 1 | | | | 4 |
| Ice hockey | | ● | ● | ● | ● | ● | ● | ● | ● | ● | 1 | ● | ● | | ● | ● | 1 | 2 |
| Luge | | ● | 1 | ● | 1 | 1 | | | | | | | | | | | | 3 |
| Nordic combined | | 1 | | | | ● | 1 | | | | | 1 | | | | | | 3 |
| Short track speed skating | | | 1 | | | 1 | | | 2 | | | | 1 | | | 3 | | 8 |
| Skeleton | | | | | | | 1 | 1 | | | | | | | | | | 2 |
| Ski jumping | | ● | 1 | | | | | ● | 1 | | 1 | | | | | | | 3 |
| Snowboarding | | | 1 | 1 | | | 1 | 1 | | | | | 1 | 1 | | | | 6 |
| Speed skating | | 1 | 1 | 1 | 1 | ● | 2 | | 1 | 1 | | 1 | 1 | | 1 | 1 | | 12 |
| Total events | | 4 | 8 | 4 | 6 | 4 | 8 | 3 | 9 | 3 | 5 | 4 | 7 | 5 | 4 | 7 | 3 | 84 |
| Cumulative total | | 4 | 12 | 16 | 22 | 26 | 34 | 37 | 46 | 49 | 54 | 58 | 65 | 70 | 74 | 81 | 84 | 84 |
| February | 10th Fri | 11th Sat | 12th Sun | 13th Mon | 14th Tue | 15th Wed | 16th Thu | 17th Fri | 18th Sat | 19th Sun | 20th Mon | 21st Tue | 22nd Wed | 23rd Thu | 24th Fri | 25th Sat | 26th Sun | Events |

== Medal table ==
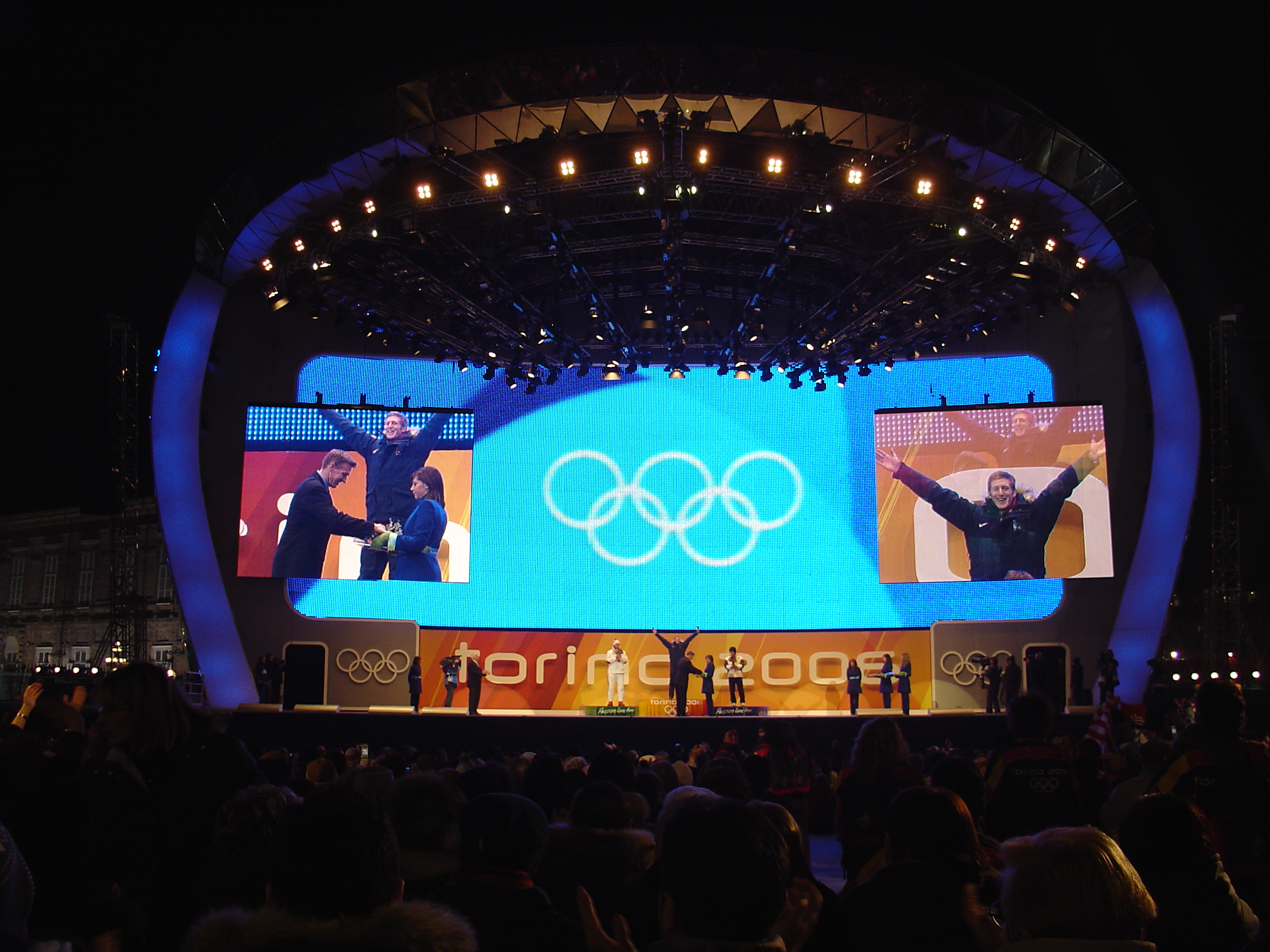
Victory ceremony at Medals Plaza

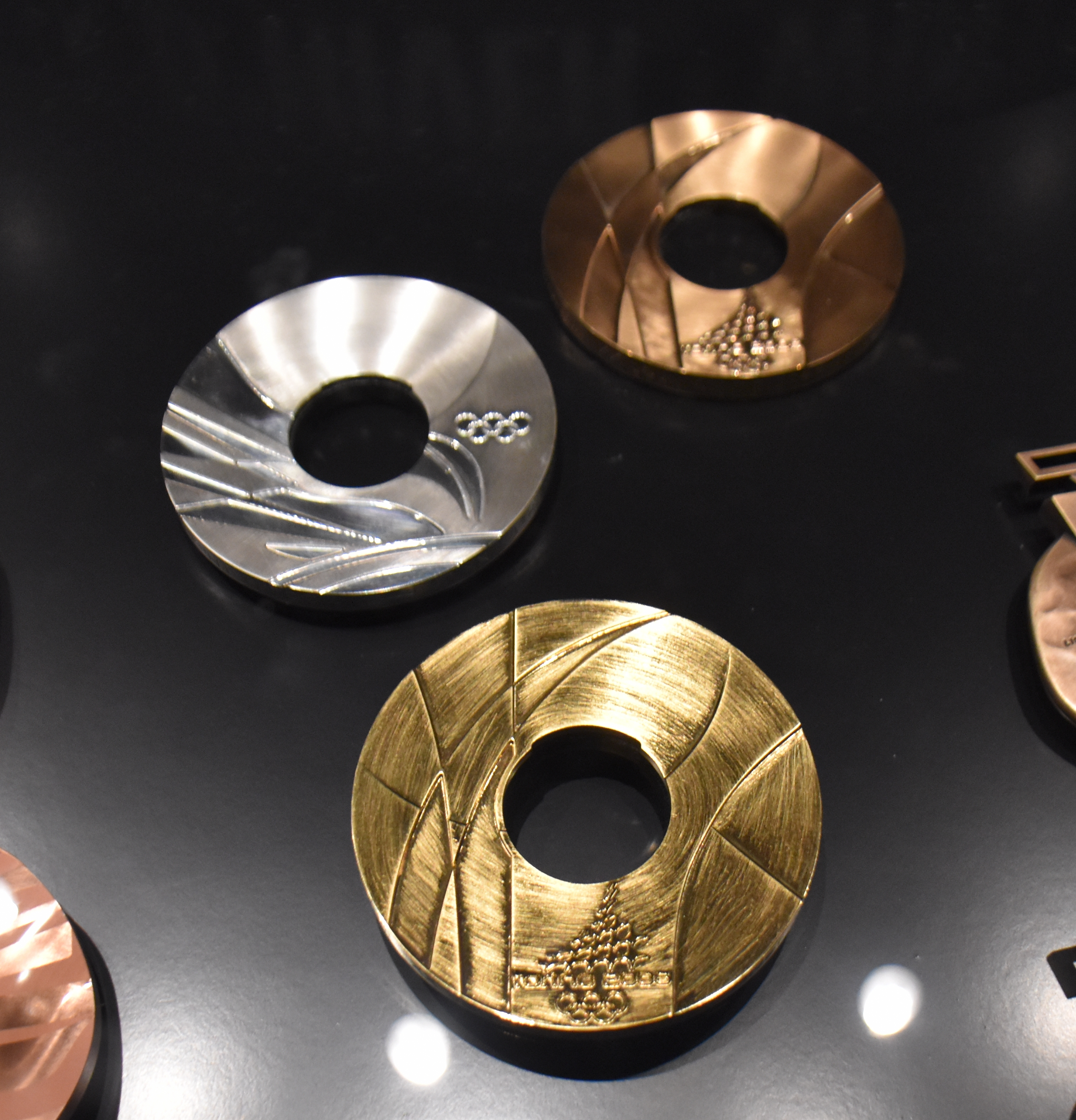
Medals of 2006 Winter Olympics

The top ten listed NOCs by number of gold medals are listed below.

Host country (Italy)

To sort this table by nation, total medal count, or any other column, click on the icon next to the column title.

| Rank | Nation | Gold | Silver | Bronze | Total |
|---|---|---|---|---|---|
| 1 | Germany | 11 | 12 | 6 | 29 |
| 2 | United States | 9 | 9 | 7 | 25 |
| 3 | Austria | 9 | 7 | 7 | 23 |
| 4 | Russia | 8 | 6 | 8 | 22 |
| 5 | Canada | 7 | 10 | 7 | 24 |
| 6 | Sweden | 7 | 2 | 5 | 14 |
| 7 | South Korea | 6 | 3 | 2 | 11 |
| 8 | Switzerland | 5 | 4 | 5 | 14 |
| 9 | Italy* | 5 | 0 | 6 | 11 |
| 10 | France | 3 | 2 | 4 | 9 |
| 10 | Netherlands | 3 | 2 | 4 | 9 |
| Totals (11 entries) | | 73 | 57 | 61 | 191 |

=== Podium sweeps ===
| Date | Sport | Event | NOC | Gold | Silver | Bronze |
|---|---|---|---|---|---|---|
| 14 February | Luge | Women's singles | Germany | Sylke Otto | Silke Kraushaar | Tatjana Hüfner |
| 25 February | Alpine Skiing | Men's slalom | Austria | Benjamin Raich | Reinfried Herbst | Rainer Schönfelder |

== Highlights ==
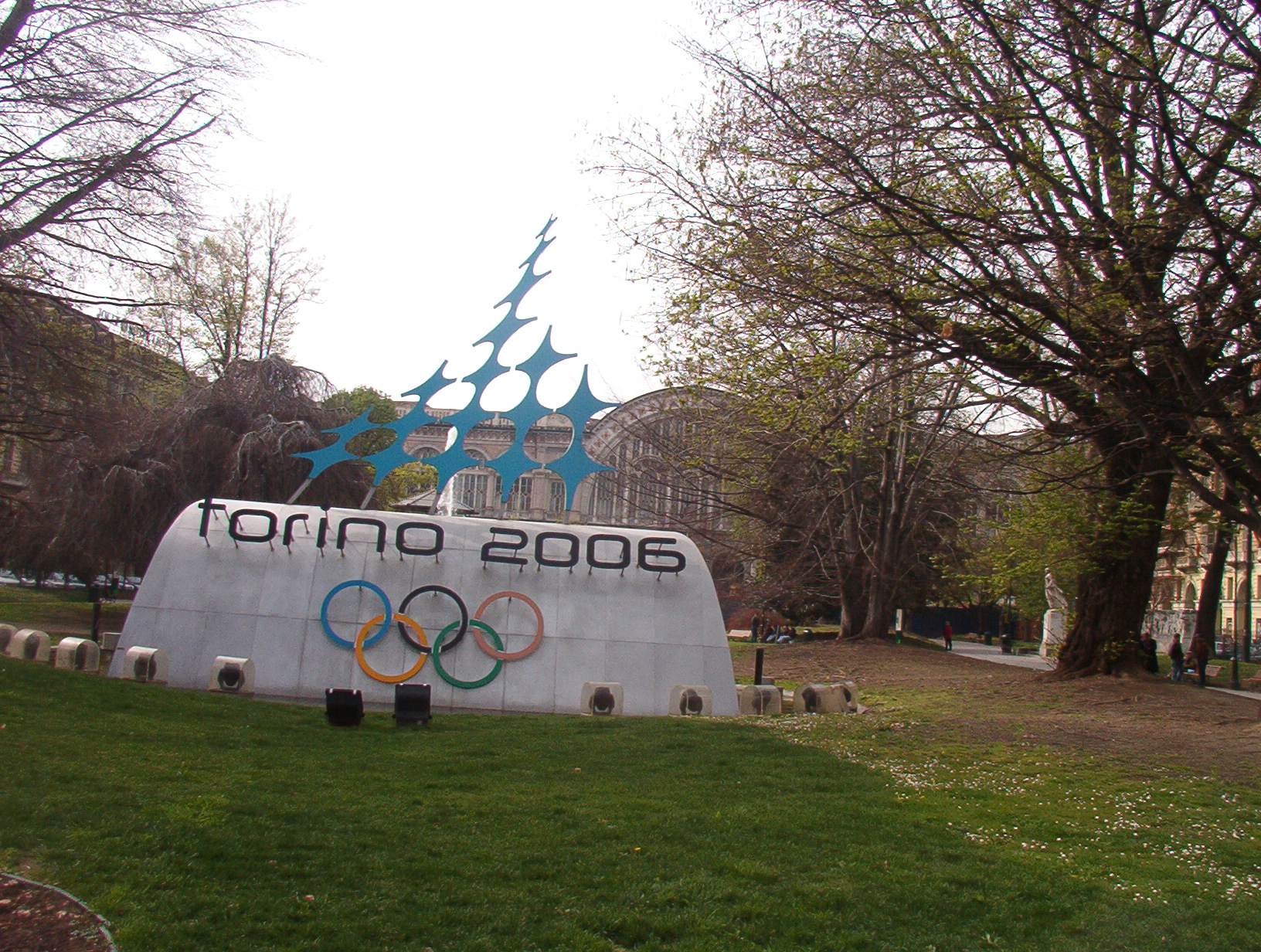
2006 Olympics logo on display in the Carlo Felice Square, in Turin

=== Day 1 (Opening Ceremony) ===
Stefania Belmondo, a 10-time Olympic medalist in cross-country skiing, lit the Olympic Cauldron during the opening ceremony on 10 February. Before that, the ceremony celebrated the best of Italy and Sport including a segment honoring the Alps. The FilmMaster Group K-events (from March 2012: Filmmaster Events) created and produced the opening and closing ceremonies of the XX Winter Olympic Games in Turin in 2006. Marco Balich was the executive producer, Alfredo Accatino the content supervisor, while Lida Castelli was the arts director. Monica Maimone of Studio Festi directed the section From Renaissance To Baroque, part of the opening ceremony.

=== Day 2 ===
The first gold medal of the 2006 Games was awarded in the 20 kilometre biathlon, won by German Michael Greis on the first day of competition. Ice hockey began with the women's competition; Sweden defeated Russia 3–1 in the first match while Canada's team opened with the second most lopsided win in Olympic history by beating the host Italians 16–0.

Germany's Georg Hettich was the surprise winner of the 15 km individual event in Nordic combined.

=== Day 3 ===
On 12 February, Latvia won its first winter Olympic medal when Mārtiņš Rubenis took the bronze in the men's luge. Armin Zöggeler's win in that event gave Italy its first gold medal of the Games and gave Zöggeler medals at four consecutive Olympics, including two golds in a row. In Alpine skiing, the men's downhill was won by Antoine Deneriaz of France.

=== Day 4 ===
Chinese figure skating pair Zhang Dan and Zhang Hao, trailing a dominant Russian pair, attempted a throw quadruple salchow jump—an element which had never been successfully completed in competition. Zhang Dan fell, injuring her knee, but the pair finished their program to a standing ovation and took the silver medal. Russia finished the third day of competition with two gold medals, as did the United States.

=== Day 5 ===
The fourth day saw Evgeni Plushenko of Russia set a world record score in the men's figure skating short program; his 90.66 points exceeded the nearest opponent's score by more than 10 points. The men's combined alpine skiing was riddled with disqualifications, including front-runners Bode Miller and Benjamin Raich. American Ted Ligety won the event in what was considered an upset.

=== Day 6 ===
Canada had another strong day on 15 February, setting new Olympic records in both men's and women's pursuit team speed skating events as well as opening the men's ice hockey competition with a win against Italy. Italy finished the day with the men's pursuit team Olympic record, however, after the Netherlands bettered Canada's time only to have Italy improve upon theirs. China won its first gold of 2006 with Wang Meng's victory in the women's individual 500-metre short track speed skating. A pair of Austrian brothers Andreas Linger and Wolfgang Linger won the men's doubles luge while Michaela Dorfmeister gave the nation another championship in the women's downhill.

=== Day 7 ===
Kristina Šmigun won her second gold medal of the Games with a victory in the women's 10 kilometre classical cross-country skiing on 16 February, remaining the only Estonian to medal. In men's curling action, Great Britain edged Germany 7–6, Switzerland kept New Zealand winless by winning 9–7, Canada beat Norway 7–6, and the United States defeated Sweden, 10–6. Evgeni Plushenko of Russia won the gold in the men's singles artistic skating.

=== Day 8 ===
On 17 February, Tanja Frieden of Switzerland took the gold in women's snowboard cross after Lindsey Jacobellis of the United States fell on the second-to-last jump while performing an unnecessary method grab. Jacobellis settled for silver (she would have won gold if she had not performed the grab), while Canada's Dominique Maltais took bronze after recovering from a crash. Duff Gibson of Canada took gold in the skeleton just ahead of fellow Canadian Jeff Pain, becoming the oldest individual gold medalist in Winter Olympics history. In the women's ice hockey semifinals, the United States lost a shootout to Sweden, marking the first time in international competition that the United States had lost to anyone other than Canada. Canada's win maintained its record of never having lost to anyone other than the United States.

=== Day 9 ===
Kjetil André Aamodt won gold for Norway in the men's super-G on 18 February, beating Hermann Maier of Austria. Germans Kati Wilhelm and Martina Glagow finished first and second in the 10 kilometre biathlon pursuit. The host Italians defeated Canada in men's curling, while Switzerland did the same in men's ice hockey to put the Canadians on the wrong end of two major upsets on the same day. The United States men's ice hockey team suffered its first loss of the tournament as Slovakia and Russia continue their dominance of the pool.

=== Day 10 ===
Lascelles Brown became the first Jamaican-born competitor to win a medal at the Winter Olympics on 19 February, competing on the Canadian 2-man bobsleigh team which finished second in an extremely tight competition. The German pair was only .21 seconds ahead of the Canadians, themselves only .14 ahead of the Swiss team. Finland continued to be unbeaten in men's ice hockey, handing Canada its second loss.

The day also saw the most hyped event of these games, at least in Europe, as the Men's 10 km Cross Country Relay was scheduled. The battle stemmed from the Lillehammer games 12 years ago in which Italy out-dueled Norway in that very same event. To that extent, many Norwegians wanted to win this event in order to embarrass the Italians on their home turf, but it was not to be as Italy crushed the field winning over Germany by over 15 seconds to take their 5th straight gold in this event. Norway failed to medal for the first time since 1988.

=== Day 11 ===
The final day of curling pool play was 20 February; Norway, Sweden, Switzerland, and Canada advanced to the women's semifinals while Finland, Canada, the United States, and Great Britain qualified in the men's competition. Austria took their first team gold medal in ski jumping, while Canada took their second in women's ice hockey.

=== Day 12 ===
Slovakia and Finland both won their final men's ice hockey games on 21 February to win their respective pools with 5–0–0 records. Enrico Fabris gave the host nation another gold medal in speed skating by winning the men's 1500 metres.

=== Day 13 ===
On 22 February, the twelfth day of competition, Anja Pärson won her first gold medal in the women's slalom; it was her fifth overall Olympic medal and third of the 2006 Games. Chandra Crawford took a quicker route to the top of the podium, winning the 1.1 kilometre cross-country sprint gold in her Olympic debut. In the men's ice hockey quarterfinals, the previously undefeated Slovaks lost to the Czech Republic while Russia, Finland, and Sweden eliminated Canada, the United States, and Switzerland, respectively. Philipp Schoch successfully defended his snowboarding giant slalom gold against his brother Simon.

=== Day 14 ===
Sweden took the women's championship in the curling finals held on 23 February. Shizuka Arakawa gave Japan its first gold medal of the Games and first figure skating gold medal, winning the ladies' figure skating competition in part by being able to finish without falling, as Sasha Cohen and Irina Slutskaya both tumbled. Russia wrested the gold medal in women's team biathlon from Germany.

=== Day 15 ===
24 February was the day of the men's curling finals, in which Canada won its first gold medal and the United States won its first medal in the sport as Canada defeated Finland and the United States beat Great Britain for the second time. The figure skating gala was also held, with top placers in all of the events performing exhibitions. Sweden and Finland won their men's ice hockey semifinal games, defeating the Czech Republic and Russia.

Gold medal won by Team Gushue in curling for Canada

=== Day 16 ===
The Austrians swept the men's alpine slalom medals on 25 February, led by Benjamin Raich. Germany took gold medals in the men's 15 kilometer biathlon and the men's individual bobsleigh. Apolo Anton Ohno won his second short track speed skating gold medal. South Korea's Jin Sun-Yu wins her third gold of the Games in the women's 1000 m. Compatriot Ahn Hyun-Soo wins his third gold medal of the Games, medaling in every men's short track event and bringing his total number of medals in Turin to four.

=== Day 17 (Closing ceremony) ===
The final day of competition and the closing ceremony, were held during the Sunday Carnival on 26 February. The Swedish men's ice hockey team handed Finland their first loss in the final to take the gold medal. In the closing ceremony, Manuela Di Centa, a seven-time Olympic medalist from Italy and then-member of the International Olympic Committee, was scheduled to present the medals for the men's 50-kilometre cross-country skiing event. This resulted in her presenting the gold medal to her own brother when Giorgio Di Centa won the event to take his second gold medal.

== Venues ==
=== Olympic areas ===
Olympic events were mainly held in Turin, but other events (namely skiing, snowboarding, and the track sports) were held in mountainous outlying villages.

==== Turin ====
Many venues were located in the Olympic District in central Turin, including:

- Oval Lingotto – Speed skating
- Torino Esposizioni – Ice hockey
- Palasport Olimpico – Ice hockey (final)
- Stadio Olimpico – Opening and closing ceremonies
- Palavela – Figure skating, short-track speed skating
- Piazza Castello - awarding ceremonies
- Olympic Village

==== Other locations ====
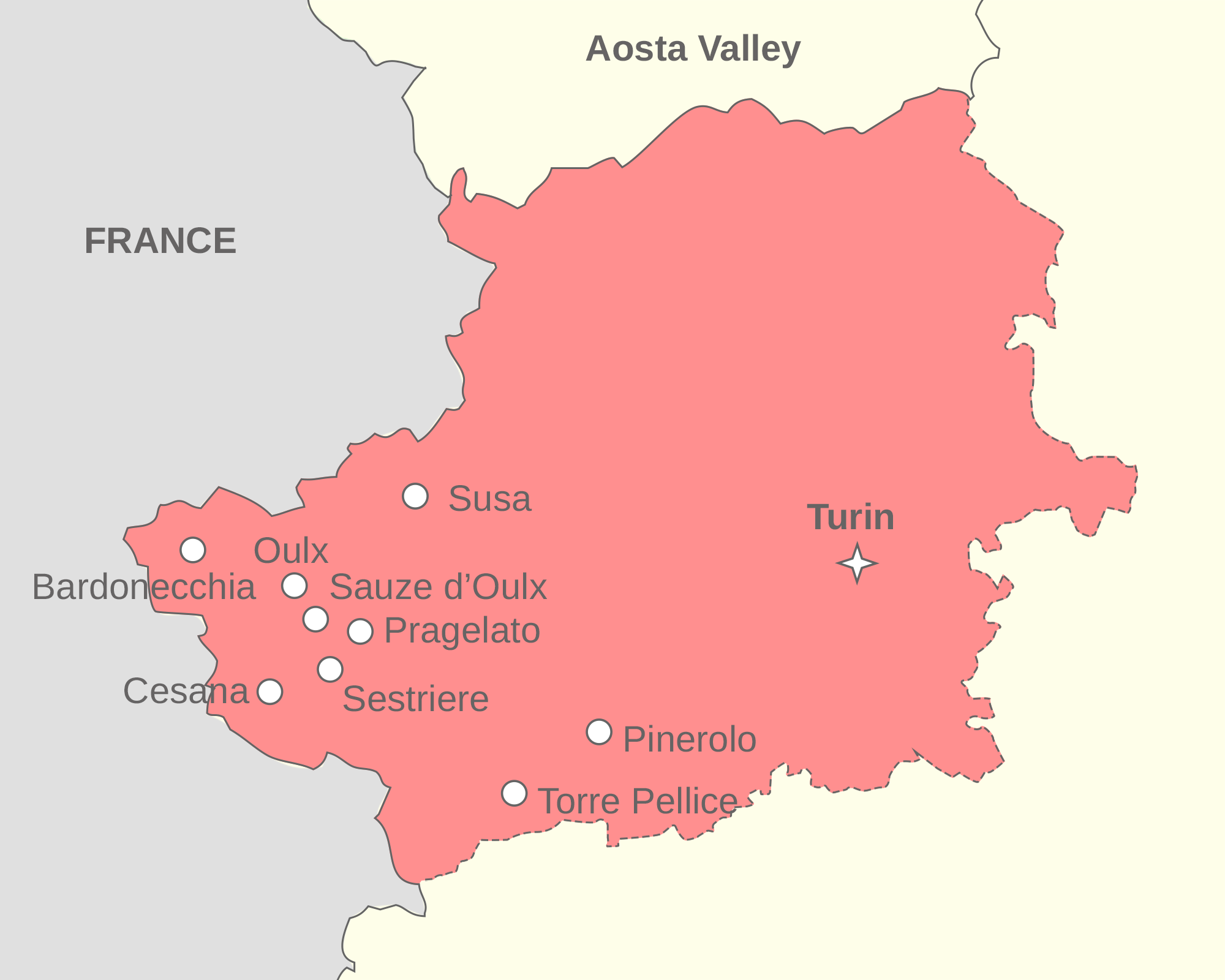
Location of venues

- Bardonecchia – Snowboarding
- Cesana Pariol – Bobsleigh, Luge, Skeleton
- Cesana San Sicario – Biathlon
- Pinerolo – Curling
- Pragelato – Nordic combined (ski jumping), Ski jumping
- Pragelato Plan – Cross-country skiing, Nordic combined (cross-country skiing)
- San Sicario Fraiteve – Alpine skiing (women's combined (downhill), downhill, and super-g)
- Sauze d'Oulx – Freestyle skiing
- Sestriere Borgata – Alpine skiing (men's combined (downhill), downhill, super-g)
- Sestriere Colle – Alpine skiing (combined (slalom), giant slalom, slalom)

=== Olympic villages ===
- Bardonecchia
- Sestriere
- Turin

=== Official Olympic training sites ===
- Chiomonte
- Claviere
- Prali
- Alpe Lusentino - Domodossola (VB) (Alpine Skiing)
- Riale - Formazza (VB) (Nordic Skiing)

=== Olympic mountain training site ===
- Torre Pellice

== Participating National Olympic Committees ==
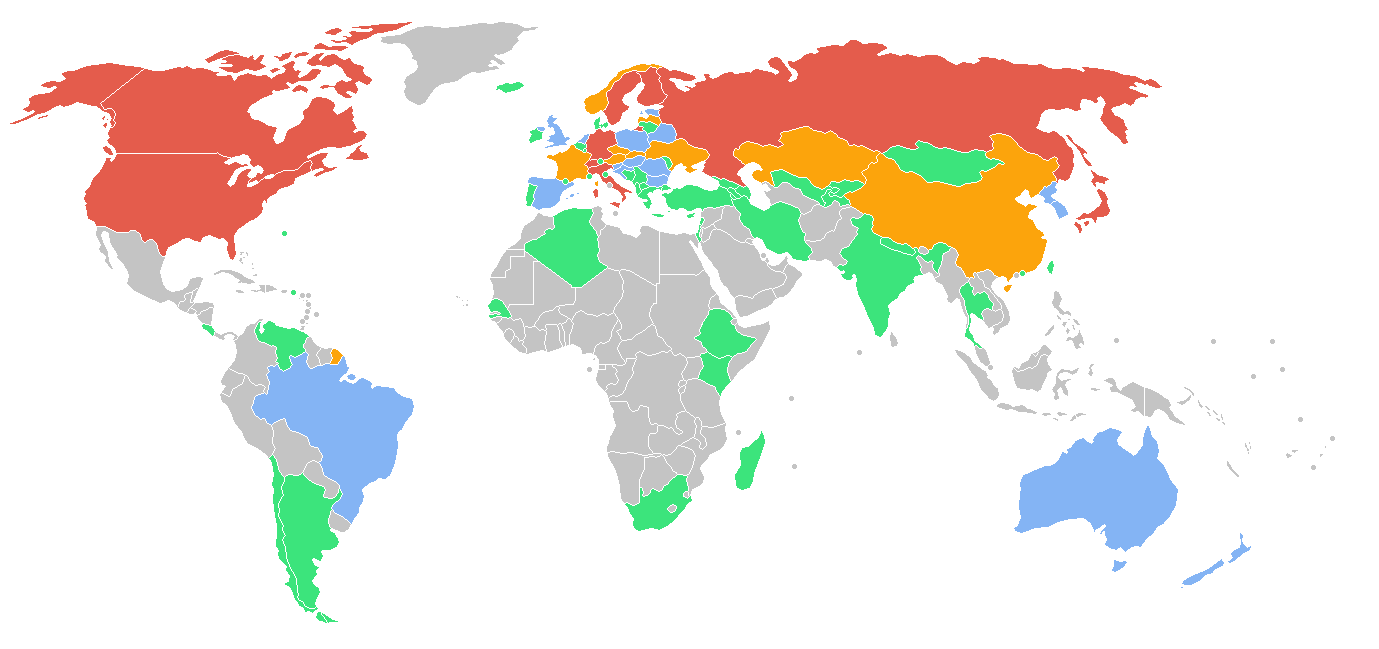
Number of athletes sent from participating NOCs: green: 1–9; blue: 10–49; orange: 50–99; red: 100 or more.

A record 80 National Olympic Committees (NOCs) entered athletes at the 2006 Winter Olympic Games. This was an increase of two from the 78 represented at the 2002 Olympic Winter Games. The number in parentheses indicates the number of participants that NOC contributed. It was the first appearance for Albania, Ethiopia and Madagascar. It was the only appearance at the Winter Olympics for Serbia and Montenegro, coming between the country's name change in 2003 from the Federal Republic of Yugoslavia and Montenegro's then-pending vote for independence in May 2006. Algeria returned to the Winter games after a 14-year absence, Senegal returned to the Winter games after a 12-year absence, and Luxembourg, North Korea and Portugal returned after 8 years. Six countries, Cameroon, Fiji, Jamaica, Mexico, Puerto Rico and Trinidad and Tobago which were at the 2002 Games, did not participate in 2006.

Participating National Olympic Committees
- Albania (1)
- Algeria (2)
- Andorra (3)
- Argentina (9)
- Armenia (5)
- Australia (40)
- Austria (73)
- Azerbaijan (2)
- Belarus (28)
- Belgium (4)
- Bermuda (1)
- Bosnia and Herzegovina (6)
- Brazil (9)
- Bulgaria (21)
- Canada (191)
- Chile (9)
- China (76)
- Chinese Taipei (1)
- Costa Rica (1)
- Croatia (22)
- Cyprus (1)
- Czech Republic (84)
- Denmark (5)
- Estonia (26)
- Ethiopia (1)
- Finland (102)
- France (82)
- Georgia (3)
- Germany (162)
- Great Britain (41)
- Greece (5)
- Hong Kong (1)
- Hungary (19)
- Iceland (5)
- India (4)
- Iran (2)
- Ireland (4)
- Israel (5)
- Italy (185) (host)
- Japan (110)
- Kazakhstan (56)
- Kenya (1)
- Kyrgyzstan (1)
- Latvia (57)
- Lebanon (3)
- Liechtenstein (5)
- Lithuania (7)
- Luxembourg (1)
- Macedonia (3)
- Madagascar (1)
- Moldova (6)
- Monaco (4)
- Mongolia (2)
- Nepal (1)
- Netherlands (33)
- New Zealand (18)
- North Korea (6)
- Norway (69)
- Poland (45)
- Portugal (1)
- Romania (25)
- Russia (190)
- San Marino (1)
- Senegal (1)
- Serbia and Montenegro (6)
- Slovakia (58)
- Slovenia (36)
- South Africa (3)
- South Korea (40)
- Spain (16)
- Sweden (106)
- Switzerland (140)
- Tajikistan (1)
- Thailand (1)
- Turkey (6)
- Ukraine (52)
- United States (204)
- Uzbekistan (4)
- Venezuela (1)
- Virgin Islands (1)

=== Number of athletes by National Olympic Committee ===
2,494 athletes from 80 NOCs participated in the 2006 Winter Olympics.

| IOC Letter Code | Country | Athletes |
|---|---|---|
| USA | United States | 204 |
| CAN | Canada | 191 |
| RUS | Russia | 190 |
| ITA | Italy | 185 |
| GER | Germany | 162 |
| SUI | Switzerland | 140 |
| JPN | Japan | 110 |
| SWE | Sweden | 106 |
| FIN | Finland | 102 |
| CZE | Czech Republic | 84 |
| FRA | France | 82 |
| CHN | China | 76 |
| AUT | Austria | 73 |
| NOR | Norway | 69 |
| SVK | Slovakia | 58 |
| LAT | Latvia | 57 |
| KAZ | Kazakhstan | 56 |
| UKR | Ukraine | 52 |
| POL | Poland | 45 |
| GBR | Great Britain | 41 |
| AUS | Australia | 40 |
| KOR | South Korea | 40 |
| SLO | Slovenia | 36 |
| NED | Netherlands | 33 |
| BLR | Belarus | 28 |
| EST | Estonia | 26 |
| ROU | Romania | 25 |
| CRO | Croatia | 22 |
| BUL | Bulgaria | 21 |
| HUN | Hungary | 19 |
| NZL | New Zealand | 18 |
| ESP | Spain | 16 |
| ARG | Argentina | 9 |
| BRA | Brazil | 9 |
| CHI | Chile | 9 |
| LTU | Lithuania | 7 |
| BIH | Bosnia and Herzegovina | 6 |
| PRK | North Korea | 6 |
| MDA | Moldova | 6 |
| SCG | Serbia and Montenegro | 6 |
| TUR | Turkey | 6 |
| ARM | Armenia | 5 |
| DEN | Denmark | 5 |
| GRE | Greece | 5 |
| ISL | Iceland | 5 |
| ISR | Israel | 5 |
| LIE | Liechtenstein | 5 |
| BEL | Belgium | 4 |
| IND | India | 4 |
| IRL | Ireland | 4 |
| MON | Monaco | 4 |
| UZB | Uzbekistan | 4 |
| AND | Andorra | 3 |
| GEO | Georgia | 3 |
| LIB | Lebanon | 3 |
| MKD | Macedonia | 3 |
| RSA | South Africa | 3 |
| ALG | Algeria | 2 |
| AZE | Azerbaijan | 2 |
| IRI | Iran | 2 |
| MGL | Mongolia | 2 |
| ALB | Albania | 1 |
| BER | Bermuda | 1 |
| CRC | Costa Rica | 1 |
| CYP | Cyprus | 1 |
| ETH | Ethiopia | 1 |
| HKG | Hong Kong | 1 |
| KEN | Kenya | 1 |
| KGZ | Kyrgyzstan | 1 |
| LUX | Luxembourg | 1 |
| MAD | Madagascar | 1 |
| NEP | Nepal | 1 |
| POR | Portugal | 1 |
| SMR | San Marino | 1 |
| SEN | Senegal | 1 |
| TPE | Chinese Taipei | 1 |
| TJK | Tajikistan | 1 |
| THA | Thailand | 1 |
| VEN | Venezuela | 1 |
| ISV | Virgin Islands | 1 |

== Organization ==
Out of 40,000 applicants, 20,000 volunteers were selected to help the athletes, spectators, and journalists, and to prepare the competition sites. They were selected by the recruiting program Noi2006.

=== Construction ===
Sixty-five sporting facilities, various infrastructures, sport villages for athletes and media, and transportation infrastructures were constructed for a total of 1.7 billion euros.

Among the most important sporting facilities that were used:

- The Stadio Olimpico (Turin) (formerly known as Stadio Comunale);
- Five sports halls (three new, two rearranged): the Palazzo a Vela re-designed by Gae Aulenti (to host short track and ice skating), the Oval Lingotto (speed ice skating), Torino Esposizioni (ice hockey), the Ice stadium in corso Tazzoli, the Palasport Olimpico designed by Arata Isozaki (ice hockey);
- The Olympic arch of Turin;
- Olympic villages of Turin, Bardonecchia and Sestriere;
- The ice stadium in Pinerolo, re-arranged and enlarged, to host the curling competition;
- A new stadium in Torre Pellice (ice hockey);
- Twelve new intermediate-level ski lifts in Cesana Torinese, Cesana San Sicario, Sestriere, Bardonecchia, Claviere, Sauze d'Oulx, Pragelato;
- The tracks for bobsled, luge, and skeleton in Cesana (the second international track in Italy, along with the one in Cortina d'Ampezzo);

The most important transport infrastructure works were:

- The Turin Metro (VAL system), which for the Olympic Games connected Collegno to the railway station of Porta Susa.
- The upgrade of 11 state roads and motorways connecting Turin with other Olympic sites, including the Motorway between Turin and Pinerolo, which was host to the Curling events.

In the city, the main developments were the Palafuksas, a glass building designed by Massimiliano Fuksas, the new Modern Art Gallery and the great project of the "Spina", that will provide urban regeneration over an area of 2 million square meters through the construction of an underground urban railway and the re-utilization of abandoned industrial areas.

== Marketing ==
=== Emblem and motto ===
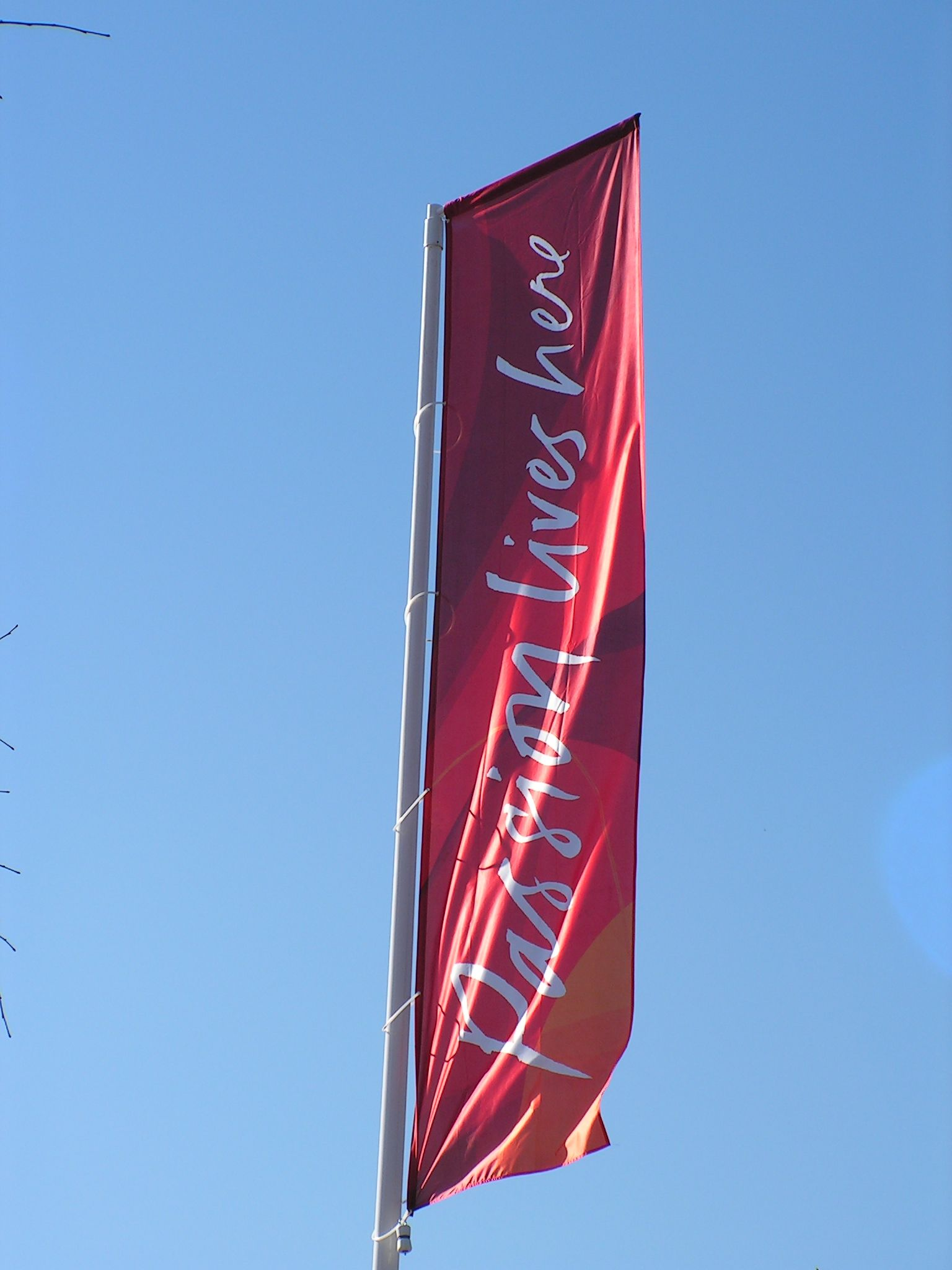
"Passion lives here", the Turin 2006 motto written by the Italian calligrapher Francesca Biasetton

The Games' logo depicted a stylized profile of the Mole Antonelliana building, drawn in white and blue ice crystals, signifying the snow and the sky. The crystal web was also meant to portray the web of new technologies and the Olympic spirit of community. The official motto of Torino 2006 was "Passion lives here".

=== Mascots ===
The 2006 Olympic mascots were Neve ("snow" in Italian), a female snowball, and Gliz, a male ice cube.

=== Sponsors ===
Sponsors of the 2006 Winter Olympics
Worldwide Olympic Partners
- Atos Origin
- Coca-Cola
- General Electric
- Kodak
- Lenovo
- John Hancock Financial
- McDonald's
- Omega SA
- Panasonic
- Samsung Electronics
- Visa Inc.
Main Sponsors
- Fiat
- Sanpaolo IMI
- Telecom Italia
Official Sponsors
- Alfa Romeo
- Alpitour
- Anheuser-Busch
- Asics
- Berloni
- Eutelsat
- Ferrovie dello Stato Italiane
- Jet Set Sports
- Johnson & Johnson
- Kyocera
- Lancia
- Leonardo-Finmeccanica
- Reale Mutua Assicurazioni
Official Suppliers
- Adecco
- Automobile Club d'Italia
- Ceriel
- Cicrespi
- Cofatech
- DB Schenker
- Europcar
- Fast-Buyer
- Fontanafredda Winery
- Garrett Metal Detectors
- Intercom Dr. Leitner
- Italcar
- Italgas
- Kearney
- Liski
- Nortel
- Ottaviani
- Pininfarina
- Recchi
- Seteco
- SITAF
- Technogym
- TicketOne

== Broadcasting ==
About 40% of the television coverage of the Olympics was in high definition.

The 2006 Winter Olympic Games were broadcast worldwide by a number of television broadcasters:

| Country | Broadcaster | Ref |
|---|---|---|
| Argentina | TyC | |
| Asia | ABU | |
| Australia | Seven Network | |
| Brazil | SporTV | |
| Canada | CBC/Radio-Canada; TSN; RDS | |
| Caribbean | CMC | |
| People's Republic of China | CCTV | |
| Chinese Taipei | CTS; TTV | |
| Estonia | ETV | |
| Europe | EBU; Eurosport | |
| Finland | Yle | |
| France | France Télévisions | |
| Germany | ARD; ZDF | |
| Iceland | RÚV | |
| Italy | RAI | |
| Japan | NHK | |
| Latin America | OTI | |
| Malaysia | RTM; Astro | |
| Mexico | Azteca | |
| Middle East | ASBU | |
| Netherlands | NOS | |
| New Zealand | TVNZ | |
| Norway | NRK | |
| Puerto Rico | Telemundo | |
| Romania | TVR | |
| Serbia and Montenegro | RTS; RTK | |
| South Africa | SuperSport | |
| South Korea | KBS; SBS | |
| Sweden | SVT | |
| Switzerland | SRG SSR | |
| United Kingdom | BBC | |
| United States | NBC | |

== Controversies ==
The Games had issues with covering costs and international attendance. Due to a lack of funding by the Italian Government, TOROC risked dissolution.

=== Metro ===
The metro was finally opened to the public on 4 February 2006, after a 45-day delay. It operated on a shorter stretch (XVIII Dicembre (Porta Susa) to Fermi – 11 stations) than originally forecast; it finally reached the main railway station (Porta Nuova) and the rest of the city centre more than one year after the Games, in October 2007. For the duration of the Games, a single ticket (5 euros) covered use of both the metro and other means of public transportation for a whole day. However, during the Games, metro service stopped at 6:00 pm, making it impractical for spectators of evening events. Furthermore, the metro did not reach any of the Olympic venues. On the other hand, the bus service was heavily improved for the Games, although still inadequate at night hours.

=== Doping ===
During the games, Italian police raided the Austrian athletes' quarters in search of evidence of blood doping. The raid was conducted due to suspicions over the presence of biathlon coach Walter Mayer, who had been banned from all Olympic events up to and including the Vancouver Olympic Games in 2010 due to previous doping convictions. Around the time of the raid Mayer and two Austrian biathletes, Wolfgang Perner and Wolfgang Rottmann, tried to escape and fled back to Austria. Later, the Austrian ski federation president said that the two athletes told him they "may have used illegal methods". Six skiers and four biathletes were also taken for drug screens by the IOC. Those substance screens later returned negative results.

On 25 April 2007, six Austrian athletes (Roland Diethard, Johannes Eder, Wolfgang Perner, Jürgen Pinter, Wolfgang Rottmann and Martin Tauber) were banned for life from the Olympics for their involvement in the doping scandal at the 2006 Turin Olympics, the first time the IOC punished athletes without a positive or missed doping test. The Austrians were found guilty of possessing doping substances and taking part in a conspiracy, based on materials seized by Italian police during the raid on the living quarters. The Austrians also had their competition results from Turin annulled.

List of athletes with doping convictions in these Games:

- Russian Olga Pyleva was stripped of her silver and other medals in the 15 km biathlon event after testing positive for carphedon.
- Brazilian bobsled athlete Armando dos Santos, ejected from the Games after a preventive antidoping test came positive (the results were from a test conducted in Brazil).

The IOC has retested nearly 500 doping samples that were collected at the 2006 Turin Games. In 2014, the Estonian Olympic Committee was notified by the IOC that a retested sample from cross-country skier Kristina Šmigun had tested positive. On 24 October 2016, the World Anti-Doping Agency Athletes' Commission stated that Šmigun, who won two gold medals at the Turin Games, faces a Court of Arbitration for Sport hearing before the end of October. In December 2017, IOC announced that re-analysis of samples resulted in no positive cases.

=== Ratings and attendance ===
A number of events reported low spectator attendance despite having acceptable ticket sales. Preliminary competition and locally less popular sports failed to attract capacity crowd as expected. Organizers explained this was because blocks of seats were reserved or purchased by sponsors and partners who later did not show up at the events.

Several news organizations reported that many Americans were not as interested in the Olympics as in years past. It has been suggested that reasons for this lack of interest include the tape delayed coverage, which showed events in prime-time as much as 18 hours later in the Western United States. Primetime viewing figures in Canada were also disappointing, especially after the early exit of the Canadian men's hockey team, though overall viewing figures were up from 2002.

== Olympic legacy ==
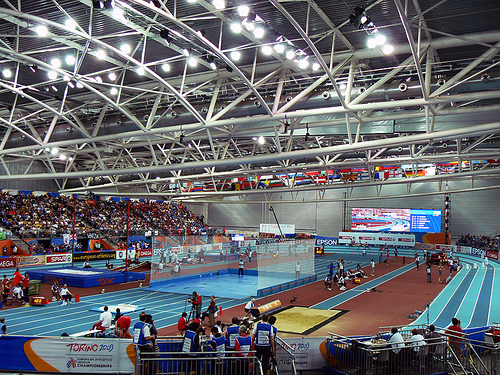
Torino's Olympic Oval hosting the 2009 European Athletics Indoor

The Olympics provided an opportunity to reshape the city's image, transitioning it from its industrial identity by showcasing its cultural life and architecture. Following the Games, Turin became one of Italy's primary tourist destinations and an important sporting center in Europe.

Since 2006, TOP (Torino Olympic Park) has been the agency in charge of managing the Olympic facilities.

== Security measures ==
As with every Olympics since the Munich massacre at the 1972 Summer Olympics and then increasingly since the Salt Lake 2002 Winter Olympics in the aftermath of the September 11 attacks, there was heavy security due to fears of terrorism.

The organizers further increased security measures in connection with the Jyllands-Posten Muhammad cartoons controversy and insisted that the Olympic Games were going to be safe, which they were; the Olympics concluded without a major breach of security occurring.

== See also ==
- 2006 Winter Paralympics
- Olympic Games held in Italy
  - 1956 Winter Olympics – Cortina D'Ampezzo
  - 1960 Summer Olympics – Rome
  - 2006 Winter Olympics – Turin
  - 2026 Winter Olympics – Milan and Cortina D'Ampezzo
- List of IOC country codes
- 2026 Winter Olympics-Milan-Cortina d'Ampezzo
- Category:Competitors at the 2006 Winter Olympics
- Neve and Gliz
- Bids for Olympic Games

Winter Olympics
| Preceded by Salt Lake City | XX Olympic Winter Games; Turin; 2006 | Succeeded by Vancouver |
