= Snowboarding at the 2006 Winter Olympics – Men's snowboard cross =

Men's snowboard cross at the XX Olympic Winter Games
- Pictogram for snowboarding
- Venue: Bardonecchia
- Date: 16 February 2006
- Competitors: 36 from 14 nations

Medalists
1st place, gold medalist(s)		Seth Wescott	United States
2nd place, silver medalist(s)		Radoslav Židek	Slovakia
3rd place, bronze medalist(s)		Paul-Henri de Le Rue	France

The men's snowboard cross event in snowboarding at the 2006 Winter Olympics was held in Bardonecchia, a village in the Province of Turin, Italy. Competition took place on 16 February 2006.

== Medalists ==
Gold	Seth Wescott; United States
Silver	Radoslav Židek; Slovakia
Bronze	Paul-Henri de Le Rue; France

== Results ==
=== Qualification ===
All competitors raced two qualification runs, with only the best of the two times used in the final ranking. The top 32 of the 36 competitors advanced to the 1/8 finals. Struck-through runs in the table below represent the discarded time for a competitor. Only one snowboarder, Michal Novotny, had first run that was faster than his second run.

Rank	Name	Nationality	Run 1 (time)	Rank	Run 2 (time)	Rank	Best time
1	Drew Neilson	Canada	~~1:22.74~~	4	1:19.33	1	1:19.33
2	Marco Huser	Switzerland	~~1:22.39~~	2	1:20.26	2	1:20.26
3	Seth Wescott	United States	~~1:22.82~~	5	1:20.69	3	1:20.69
4	Tommaso Tagliaferri	Italy	~~1:23.03~~	9	1:20.93	4	1:20.93
5	Xavier de Le Rue	France	~~1:23.42~~	14	1:20.97	5	1:20.97
6	Dieter Krassnig	Austria	~~1:24.01~~	21	1:21.00	6	1:21.00
7	Nate Holland	United States	~~1:22.71~~	3	1:21.03	7	1:21.03
8	Jordi Font	Spain	~~1:22.35~~	1	1:21.18	8	1:21.18
9	Radoslav Židek	Slovakia	~~1:30.91~~	36	1:21.19	9	1:21.19
10	Paul-Henri de Le Rue	France	~~1:23.00~~	8	1:21.21	10	1:21.21
11	Lukas Gruener	Austria	~~1:23.05~~	10	1:21.28	11	1:21.28
12	Damon Hayler	Australia	~~1:24.79~~	28	1:21.51	12	1:21.51
13	Mateusz Ligocki	Poland	~~1:23.35~~	13	1:21.81	13	1:21.81
14	Jonte Grundelius	Sweden	~~1:24.53~~	26	1:21.85	14	1:21.85
15	Jason R. Smith	United States	~~1:23.65~~	15	1:21.98	15	1:21.98
16	Rafal Skarbek-Malczewski	Poland	~~1:24.70~~	27	1:22.07	16	1:22.07
17	Hans Joerg Unterrainer	Austria	~~1:23.32~~	12	1:22.10	17	1:22.10
18	Tom Velisek	Canada	~~1:22.83~~	6	1:22.12	18	1:22.12
19	Stefano Pozzolini	Italy	~~1:24.52~~	25	1:22.23	19	1:22.23
20	Jasey Jay Anderson	Canada	~~1:24.25~~	22	1:22.27	20	1:22.27
21	Ueli Kestenholz	Switzerland	~~1:23.16~~	11	1:22.32	21	1:22.32
22	Alberto Schiavon	Italy	~~1:24.84~~	30	1:22.38	22	1:22.38
23	Michael Layer	Germany	~~1:23.92~~	19	1:22.43	23	1:22.43
24	Mattias Blomberg	Sweden	~~1:23.98~~	20	1:22.48	24	1:22.48
25	Sylvain Duclos	France	~~1:23.85~~	18	1:22.55	25	1:22.55
26	Mario Fuchs	Austria	~~1:24.82~~	29	1:22.60	26	1:22.60
27	Itaru Chimura	Japan	~~1:25.86~~	32	1:22.83	27	1:22.83
28	Michal Novotny	Czech Republic	1:22.92	7	~~1:23.68~~	34	1:22.92
29	Graham Watanabe	United States	~~1:24.85~~	31	1:22.98	28	1:22.98
30	Francois Boivin	Canada	~~1:23.74~~	16	1:23.17	29	1:23.17
31	David Speiser	Germany	~~1:24.28~~	24	1:23.38	30	1:23.38
31	Jonatan Johansson	Sweden	~~1:26.72~~	34	1:23.38	30	1:23.38
33	Simone Malusa	Italy	~~1:24.27~~	23	1:23.53	32	1:23.53
34	Ibón Idigoras	Spain	~~1:23.80~~	17	1:23.56	33	1:23.56
35	Pierre Vaultier	France	~~1:27.61~~	35	1:23.75	35	1:23.75
36	Alex Kupprion	Germany	~~1:26.22~~	33	1:24.66	36	1:24.66

=== Elimination round ===
The top 32 qualifiers advanced to the 1/8 round. From here, they participated in four-person elimination races, with the top two from each race advancing.

==== 1/8 round ====
Heat 1

Seed	Name	Rank
17	Hans Joerg Unterrainer (AUT)	1
32	Jonatan Johansson (SWE)	2
1	Drew Neilson (CAN)	3
16	Rafal Skarbek-Malczewski (POL)	4

Heat 2

Seed	Name	Rank
9	Radoslav Židek (SVK)	1
8	Jordi Font (ESP)	2
24	Mattias Blomberg (SWE)	3
25	Sylvain Duclos (FRA)	4

Heat 3

Seed	Name	Rank
12	Damon Hayler (AUS)	1
28	Michal Novotny (CZE)	2
5	Xavier de Le Rue (FRA)	3
21	Ueli Kestenholz (SUI)	4

Heat 4

Seed	Name	Rank
20	Jasey Jay Anderson (CAN)	1
4	Tommaso Tagliaferri (ITA)	2
29	Graham Watanabe (USA)	3
13	Mateusz Ligocki (POL)	4

Heat 5

Seed	Name	Rank
3	Seth Wescott (USA)	1
30	Francois Boivin (CAN)	2
19	Stefano Pozzolini (ITA)	3
14	Jonte Grundelius (SWE)	4

Heat 6

Seed	Name	Rank
6	Dieter Krassnig (AUT)	1
27	Itaru Chimura (JPN)	2
22	Alberto Schiavon (ITA)	3
11	Lukas Gruener (AUT)	4

Heat 7

Seed	Name	Rank
7	Nate Holland (USA)	1
10	Paul-Henri de Le Rue (FRA)	2
26	Mario Fuchs (AUT)	3
23	Michael Layer (GER)	4

Heat 8

Seed	Name	Rank
15	Jason R. Smith (USA)	1
2	Marco Huser (SUI)	2
18	Tom Velisek (CAN)	3
31	David Speiser (GER)	4

==== Quarterfinals ====
Quarterfinal 1

Seed	Name	Rank
9	Radoslav Židek (SVK)	1
8	Jordi Font (ESP)	2
32	Jonatan Johansson (SWE)	3
17	Hans Joerg Unterrainer (AUT)	4

Quarterfinal 2

Seed	Name	Rank
20	Jasey Jay Anderson (CAN)	1
12	Damon Hayler (AUS)	2
4	Tommaso Tagliaferri (ITA)	3
28	Michal Novotny (CZE)	4

Quarterfinal 3

Seed	Name	Rank
3	Seth Wescott (USA)	1
6	Dieter Krassnig (AUT)	2
30	Francois Boivin (CAN)	3
27	Itaru Chimura (JPN)	4

Quarterfinal 4

Seed	Name	Rank
15	Jason R. Smith (USA)	1
10	Paul-Henri de Le Rue (FRA)	2
2	Marco Huser (SUI)	3
7	Nate Holland (USA)	4

==== Semifinals ====
Semifinal 1

Seed	Name	Rank
9	Radoslav Židek (SVK)	1
8	Jordi Font (ESP)	2
12	Damon Hayler (AUS)	DQ
20	Jasey Jay Anderson (CAN)	DQ

Semifinal 2

Seed	Name	Rank
10	Paul-Henri de Le Rue (FRA)	1
3	Seth Wescott (USA)	2
15	Jason R. Smith (USA)	3
6	Dieter Krassnig (AUT)	4

==== Finals ====
The four semifinalists who failed to advanced to the big final competed in the small final to determine 5th through 8th places. The four last place finishers in the quarterfinals contested a 13th–16th classification race, while the third-placed finishers raced for 9th through 13th.

Large Final

Seed	Name	Rank
3	Seth Wescott (USA)	Gold medal
9	Radoslav Židek (SVK)	Silver medal
10	Paul-Henri de Le Rue (FRA)	Bronze medal
8	Jordi Font (ESP)	4

Small Final

Seed	Name	Rank
20	Jasey Jay Anderson (CAN)	5
15	Jason R. Smith (USA)	6
12	Damon Hayler (AUS)	7
6	Dieter Krassnig (AUT)	8

Classification 9–12

Seed	Name	Rank
2	Marco Huser (SUI)	9
30	Francois Boivin (CAN)	10
4	Tommaso Tagliaferri (ITA)	11
32	Jonatan Johansson (SWE)	12

Classification 13–16

Seed	Name	Rank
28	Michal Novotny (CZE)	13
7	Nate Holland (USA)	14
17	Hans Joerg Unterrainer (AUT)	15
27	Itaru Chimura (JPN)	16
