= Spain at the 2006 Winter Olympics =

- IOC code: ESP
- NOC: Spanish Olympic Committee
- Website: www.coe.es (in Spanish)

in Turin
- Competitors: 16 (7 men, 9 women) in 5 sports
- Flag bearers: María José Rienda (opening); Juan Jesús Gutiérrez (closing)
- Medals: Gold 0 Silver 0 Bronze 0 Total 0

Winter Olympics appearances (overview)
- 1936; 1948; 1952; 1956; 1960; 1964; 1968; 1972; 1976; 1980; 1984; 1988; 1992; 1994; 1998; 2002; 2006; 2010; 2014; 2018; 2022; 2026

Spain competed at the 2006 Winter Olympics in Turin, Italy.

== Alpine skiing ==
María José Rienda entered the Olympics having won three World Cup events on the season, including the last giant slalom before the Olympic Games, but couldn't repeat this form in Turin, as she finished 13th in the giant slalom.

Athlete	Event	Final				
Athlete	Event	Run 1	Run 2	Run 3	Total	Rank
Andrea Casasnovas	Women's downhill	n/a			2:06.73	38
Andrea Casasnovas	Women's combined	did not start				
Leyre Morlans	Women's downhill	did not finish				
Leyre Morlans	Women's super-G	n/a			1:38.53	49
María José Rienda	Women's super-G	did not finish				
María José Rienda	Women's giant slalom	1:02.28	1:09.85	n/a	2:12.13	13
Carolina Ruiz Castillo	Women's downhill	n/a			2:01.09	30
Carolina Ruiz Castillo	Women's super-G	n/a			1:35.20	30
Carolina Ruiz Castillo	Women's giant slalom	1:03.18	1:10.36	n/a	2:13.54	20
Carolina Ruiz Castillo	Women's combined	41.74	46.47	1:32.72	3:00.93	25

Note: In the men's combined, run 1 is the downhill, and runs 2 and 3 are the slalom. In the women's combined, run 1 and 2 are the slalom, and run 3 the downhill.

== Biathlon ==
The lone Spanish biathlete in Turin, Luis Alberto Hernando, finished 80th in the men's individual event.

Athlete	Event	Final		
Athlete	Event	Time	Misses	Rank
Luis Alberto Hernando	Men's sprint	32:26.0	4	83
Luis Alberto Hernando	Men's individual	1:06:54:4	7	80

== Cross-country skiing ==
Even after Johann Mühlegg was disqualified for doping after having won the men's 50 kilometre race, Spain's top cross-country performance was in that race, as Juan Jesús Gutiérrez finished 22nd.

Distance

Athlete	Event	Final	
Athlete	Event	Total	Rank
Laia Aubert Torrents	Women's 10 km classical	33:29.4	64
Laia Aubert Torrents	Women's 15 km pursuit	50:41.3	61
Juan Jesús Gutiérrez	Men's 50 km freestyle	2:06:43.3	22
Laura Orgue	Women's 10 km classical	33:18.6	63
Laura Orgue	Women's 15 km pursuit	51:16.5	63
Diego Ruiz	Men's 15 km classical	41:37.9	46
Diego Ruiz	Men's 30 km pursuit	1:24:05.5	54
Diego Ruiz	Men's 50 km freestyle	2:06:51.6	23
Vicente Vilarrubla	Men's 15 km classical	43:47.2	65
Vicente Vilarrubla	Men's 30 km pursuit	1:19:39.8	31
Vicente Vilarrubla	Men's 50 km freestyle	2:09:03.1	42

== Freestyle skiing ==
Spain's lone competitor in the freestyle skiing events in Turin was unable to advance in the women's moguls, as she finished second last in the qualifying round.

Athlete	Event	Qualifying		Final	
Athlete	Event	Points	Rank	Points	Rank
Nuria Montane	Women's moguls	11.76	29	did not advance	29

== Snowboarding ==
Jordi Font was involved in a notable incident in his semifinal, as he collided with Canada's Jasey-Jay Anderson. Anderson beat Font down for second place, but the Canadian was disqualified for missing a gate, sending Font through to the final. In the final, Font again fell, but this time ended up in fourth position.

Halfpipe

Athlete	Event	Qualifying run 1		Qualifying run 2		Final		
Athlete	Event	Points	Rank	Points	Rank	Run 1	Run 2	Rank
Queralt Castellet	Women's halfpipe	20.5	19	18.3	20	did not advance		26
Iker Fernandez	Men's halfpipe	27.0	22	27.0	22	did not advance		28
Clara Villoslada	Women's halfpipe	10.3	29	11.4	24	did not advance		30

Note: In the final, the single best score from two runs is used to determine the ranking. A bracketed score indicates a run that wasn't counted.

Snowboard cross

Athlete	Event	Qualifying		1/8 finals	Quarterfinals	Semifinals	Finals	
Athlete	Event	Time	Rank	Position	Position	Position	Position	Rank
Jordi Font	Men's snowboard cross	1:21.18	8 Q	2 Q	2 Q	2 Q	4	4
Ibon Idigoras	Men's snowboard cross	1:23.56	34	did not advance				34
