= Velliscig =

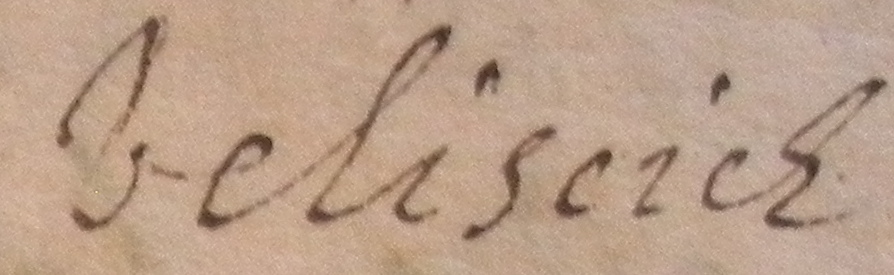
- Surname in 1600

Origin
- Language: Slavic language
- Meaning: from the German name Welisch and the Czech name Velis
- Region of origin: Austro-Hungarian Empire, Italy

Other names
- Variant forms: Velicig, Velesig, Vellini, Velisi, Velluszhik, Welisch (German), Velíšek (Czech), Velišček (Slovenian)

Velliscig (also view the variants) is an Austrian/Italian surname which is derived from the German name Welisch and the Czech name Veliš. Its origins can be traced back to a German noble family which lived in Bohemia (now Czech Rep). In the 16th century, some members of this family moved to the village of Velindol, which is near the town of Gorizia, Italy. According to research conducted, the surname Vellsicig may derive from the noble family Velišovští z Velišova

== The Italian branch ==
This name, from 1580 onwards, had its epicenter near the town of Gorz, Austria (now Gorizia Italy) in the Valley of the Judrio, concentrated in the area of Zapotok, Kanal ob Soči (now in Slovenia), but especially in the small hamlet of Vélendol to which he gave the first name. 1592 Vrsiza Vilisiza de Oborza 1596 Juuan Veliseche Cahal of Judri 1612 Michel Veliscech, 1643 Peter Velaszahk de Idria. From the year 1710, the Velluszhik families that lived in the Zapotok area also carried on the name including some of the following people, Antonius Velluszhik (born 1710); Christianus Velluszhik (born 1740, died 1820); Andreas Velluszhik (Born in Velendol 1770, died 1803); Michael Velluszhik (born 1772, died 1858); Stephanus Velluszhik (born in Zapotok 1796, died 1868) and Christianus Velluszhik (born 1827, died 1902) whose son Christian Velluszhik (born 1860, died 1934) was the mayor of a small town in Slovenia known as Anhovo from 1910 to 1914. The family surname was changed to Veluscek and Veliscek around the 1900s. The "Italian" branches of Velliscig family in 1800, which had a common ancestor, can be divided into Velliscig "cuja", Velliscig of Podresca, Velliscig of Zapatok, Velliscig "Pochig". From there it spread to the Valley of the lsonzo where it is present in the form of Slovenia (Velišček), in the valleys of San Leonardo (Vellescig), in Cividale (Vellisig) and in the Friuli and Padania plain (Velisig, Velliscig). In the 1900s after a period in France (Luigi) moves in the province of Gorizia, (Eugenio) emigrated to the United States.

=== Theft deacon Martino Velliscig ===
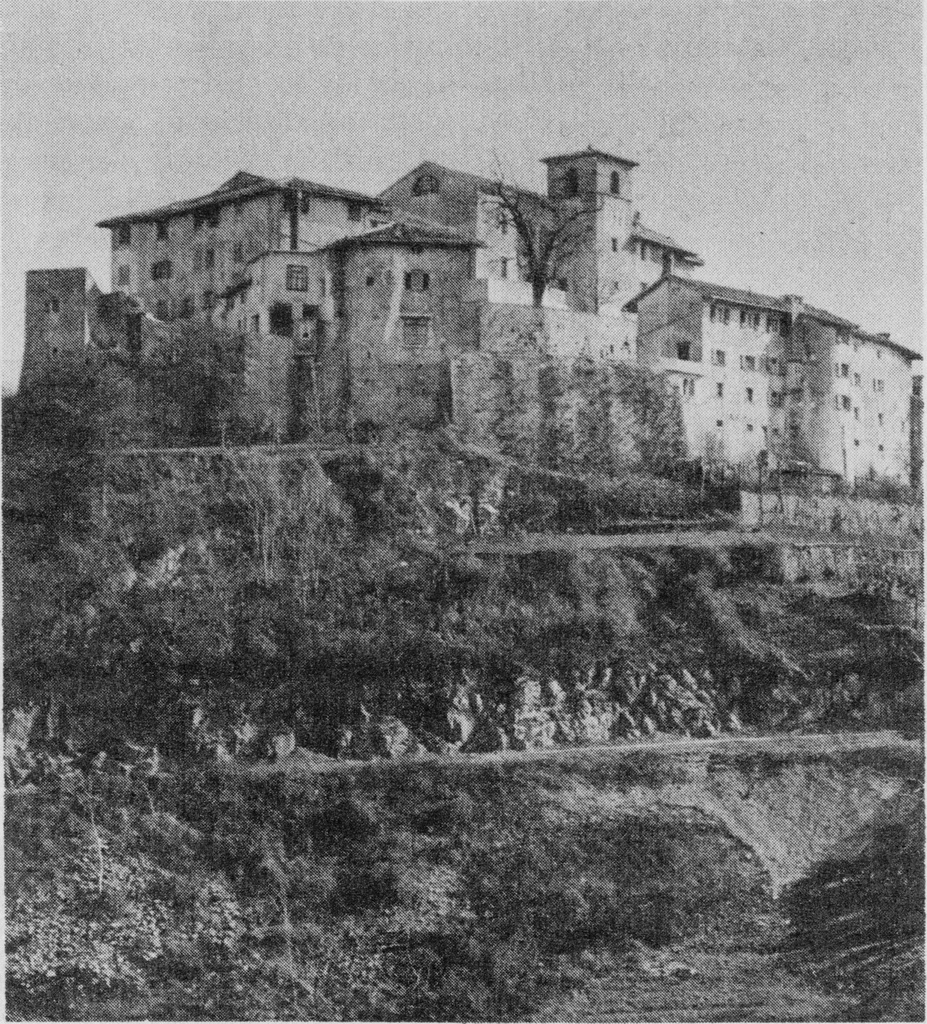
Castelmonte (UD)

On the morning of November 29, 1738 the nonzolo the Shrine of Our Lady of Castelmonte, complained that he had found that morning opened the doors of the sanctuary and has verified the theft of sacred objects. The track for the identification of the thief was already the next day, when it appeared in the chapter of Cividale Paravano George, dean of the village of Codromaz, carrying a piece of candlestick and black skirt with a button thread color "monkish". Veliscigh Michele, one of the two boys, had reported that the button that seemed to come from the habit of the cleric Martin, his brother, who was living at the sanctuary. Fled from the castle, in the Veneto region, the two thieves were so direct in imperial territory, surpassing with end in the valley of Idrija, where they stayed for some time, and they headed the investigation, the chapter entrusted to the archdeacon Tolmin. Towards the end of December Martino Veliscigh, after hearing being sought, he sent a letter to the dean of Idria trying to distance himself and his brother Andrea suspected of being responsible for the theft, but also gave the track to retrieve objects. The investigations launched in the meantime had identified in Gorizia the Jew who had bought silver. The April 17, 1739 came from Tolmin the news of the capture and imprisonment of deacon Martino Veliscigh. The situation returned to move in 1748, calling into question other authorities, the nuncio bridges fi ce at Vienna and the Roman Curia. Addressing the nuncio the Veliscigh, from Albana, where he had retired with his father, he wrote that he had been released from jail and later from captivity for intervention of Our Lady of the Turks and asked to be acquitted of the charges, because Austrian subject and you want to be ordained priest. This was confirmed by Rome on December 5. For the chapter had trouble, because asking ordination and damages. The matter is closed them, while the chapter was to conduct a new investigation into the responsibility of the theft that was being laid to fabbricieri in office in 1739, in particular to the canon treasurer Carlo Boiani, to which the result was announced, not that we know of other developments. But the story of Martin did not end there, Mattia Crisetigh, with whom our Martino has a violent clash triggers the start of another process by the chapter.

=== Velich village ===
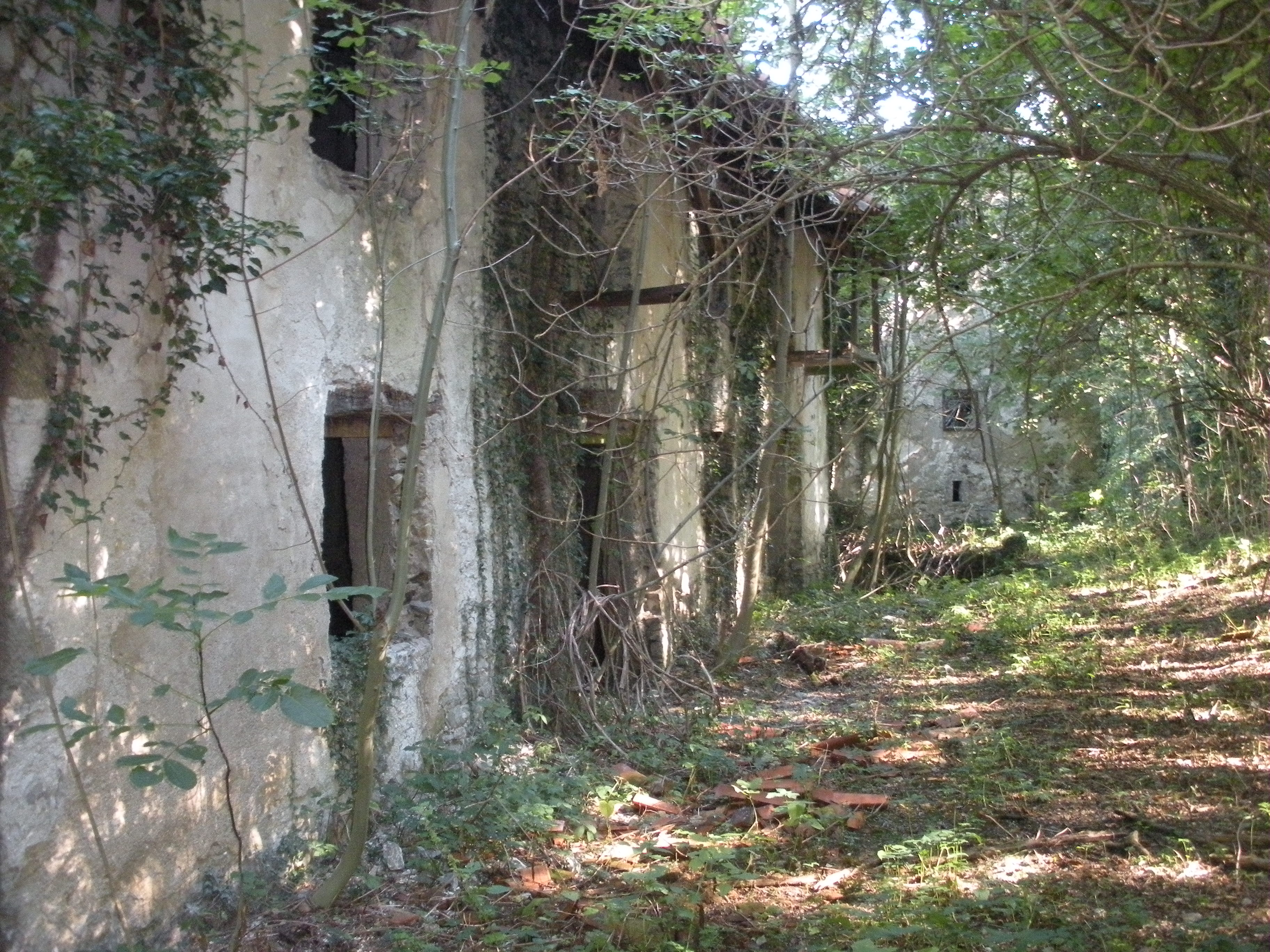
The village, now abandoned, of Velendol / Velindó / Velich

The village of Velich / Velindò today Velendol (SLO), is a cluster of empty houses near the settlement of Zapotok, a few kilometers from the secondary pass Ponte Misecco. The first written mention is in 1650. With the Convention of Fontainebleau of 1807, passed, for a short period until 1814, along with all the territories on the right bank of the river Isonzo, in the Napoleonic Kingdom of Italy under the Department of Passariano in the municipality of Anhovo. With the Congress of Vienna in 1815 returned to Austria; passed then administratively to the Austrian Littoral in 1849 as part of the municipality of Plava. Between the two world wars was part of the Kingdom of Italy; then passed to Yugoslavia and then to Slovenia. To remember the Mlinarjev's Mill (Mill Mlinarjev) under Velendol. The mill had two millstones to grind both maize grain. The mill was active until 1960. In the early 19th century, many emigrated to the United States of America,(Indiana, Ohio, Illinois), naturalizing the surname.

== Brief historical timeline ==
- 1550 Velešič of Dubove (Slovakia).
- 1592 Vrsiza Vilisiza de Oborza (Italy)
- 1598 Urban Veliscigh, imperial subject archducal is "accused" along with his brother in law Marcolino, by John Codermazo from Pregore, during the process of Martino Duriavig incuterli of fear.

"Why do not you appeared due to the obedience of this Holy Office called et being invoked? I'm not appeared before hora because I was scared that they wanted to put in prison et do much damage. These were that scared me Marcollino of Oborza Urban et Veliscigh his brother of the Canal Iudrio imperial subject archducal et Anco Gregory of Codermazo. Sir, no other that I was not made more fear. »

(July 25, 1598 - The third process Duriavig)

- 13/02/1611 Valentin Velischich born son of Stephen.
- 1612 Michel Veliscech, part of the brotherhood of Castelmonte.
- 05.05.1678 Thomas Veliscig de Sapatochg falling from a tree branch, dies instantly smashed.
- 07.10.1704 She was killed by a conjunct Sapotoch Marinza, wife of Luca Velchich.
- 06/18/1720 Falling from a tree, dies instantly Canciano Velluscig said Clanscig of Poppeg (Podpecchio). He was about 40 years old.
- 1746 Velliscig de Podreska (Podresca).
- 1750 Andrea's son Stefano Velliscig q. Gregory q. Stefano q. George, of Lasiz, wife Giovanna daughter of Urban Salamant.
- 1820 Velliscig Cristiano of Codromaz, priest.
- 1850 Velliscig mayor of Castelmonte.

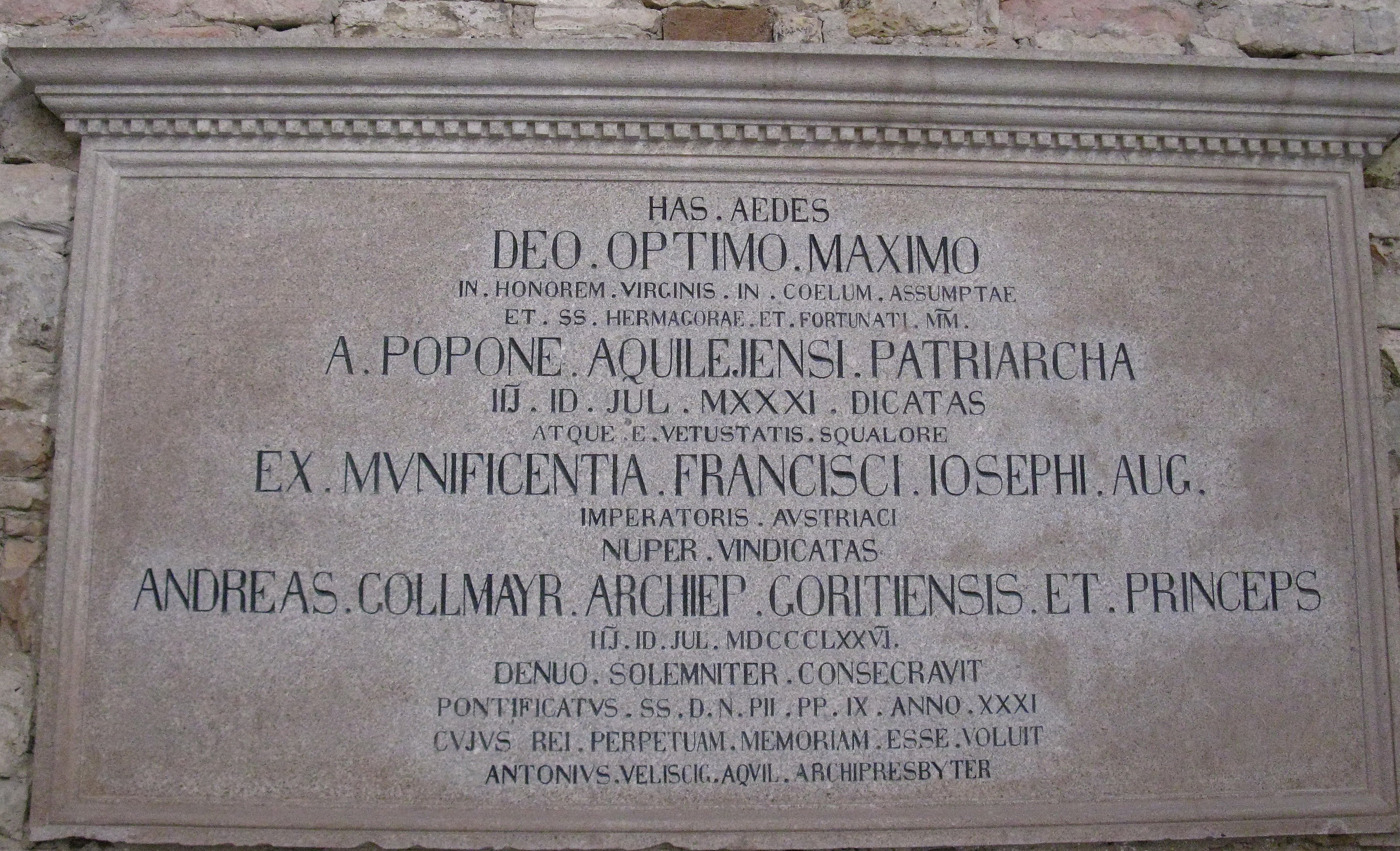
Inscription in the Basilica of Aquileia in memory of Antonio Veliscig

- 1860 Veliscig Antonio, lord of Aquileia, honorary vicar of the Cathedral of Gorizia who strongly wanted the National Archaeological Museum of Aquileia.
- 1864 Domenico Veliscig, dean of Aquileia and writer, and Don Adam Zanetti, pastor of Brazzano, restoring the little church of Ruttars (Austro - Hungarian Empire) with the help of several illustrious and benefactors, such as' their Majesty Elizabeth, and Ferdinando Maria Anna of the House of Austria.
- 1877 - 06/26/1909 Emilia Velliscig wife of the Prof. Francesco Musoni.
- 1880 In the house where the family lives in wealthy Veliscig Podresca, is the post office, is also the service of selling brands and newspaper delivery.
- 1910 to 1914 Christian Velluszhik, Mayor of Anhovo, Austria
- 1914 Velliscig Achille mayor of Prepotto.
- 1921 Poletti - Velliscig Lydia musician, writer texts for piano.
- 01/20/1944 Veliscig Francis Joseph of Dolegna del Collio; captured by the SS while transiting near Roditti, on a freight line Divača-Trieste.
- 05/02/1944 Velliscig Angelina, who was killed in Seberiach Salona of Soca by members of the Beneška Ceta.
- 27/04/1945 Velliscig Lamberto S. Leonardo died in the extermination camp of Mauthausen.

== Variants ==
Proto-Slavic	German	Czech	Slovenian	Italian	American
Велесик	Welisch	Velíšek	Velišček	Velisig o Vellisig	Velicig
	(Wellisch)	Velišik	Velušček	Velesig o Vellescig	Velishek
		(Velišovi)	Veluščik		Velisek
		Velišovský			

== Etymology ==
Welisch in 1300

The etymology is uncertain, the surname Velliscig and its variants could arise:

- the proper name Velech or Велес
- from the village of origin: Veliš

In all cases must be added the patronymic -ic or -ig or the formant of the place -ščak / -šek.

== Streets and cities ==
- Via Velliscig - Cividale del Friuli, Udine, Italy
- Vellesig Rd - Shelocta, Pennsylvania, United States
- Velendol - Kanal ob Soči, Slovenia

== Notable people ==
- Martin Velíšek (born 1963), Czech artist
- Tom Velisek (born 1981), Canadian snowboarder
- Randy Velischek (born 1962), Canadian ice hockey player

== Bibliography ==
Italian language

- Historical memories forogiuliesi, Volume 10, Deputation of history home to the Friuli, 1914
- B. Zuanella, Slovenski priimki v občini Svet Lenart. Vellescig, in "Sun", n. 9, 1991
- F. Nazzi, Religious history of Slavia Friulana from its origins to 1920, Udine, F. Nazzi, 2008
- F.Tassin, Churches of Collio , Gorizia, New Initiative Isontina - Study Centre "Antonio Rizzatti", 2003
- G. Biasutti, Castelmonte, historical guide of the sanctuary, Castelmonte, 1992
- G. Fantini, E. Costantini, Surnames of Friuli, Udine, Messaggero Veneto, 2002
- G. engineers, History of the Sanctuary of Castelmonte, Castelmonte Castelmonte Editions, 2002
- G. Menis, C. Begotti, History of Friuli. From its origins to the fall of the patriarchal (1420) with nods to the 20th century, Udine, Friuli Philological Society, 2002
- T. Weavers, History of the Catholic movement in Friuli: 1858-1917, Del Bianco, 1964

Slovenian language

- S. Rutar, Beneška Slovenija: prirodoznanski in Zgodovinski opis, 1899

Archives in Latin - Italian

- Archive capitulate, Cividale (CAC) - Processes criminals.
- State Archives of Gorizia - Lists of leverage.
- State Archive of Udine - Lists of leverage.
- Historical Archives of the Archdiocese of Udine (AAUD) - Holy Office, processes.
- Archival Parish Prepotto (APP) - Books baptized, marriage and death
- Archival Parish S. Leonardo (APS) - Books baptized, marriage and death
- Confraternity of the Blessed Sacrament of Castelmonte, 1400 ca Manuscript of Castelmonte
