= Chronological summary of the 2006 Winter Olympics =

This article contains a chronological summary of the 2006 Winter Olympics in Turin, Italy.

== Highlights ==
=== Opening ceremony – 10 February ===
Opening ceremony
Stefania Belmondo lit the Olympic flame. Actresses Susan Sarandon and Sophia Loren (along with some other famous women) carried a flag into the stadium while Laura Bush and Cherie Blair watched from special seats in the audience. Luciano Pavarotti, in his final performance, sang Nessun Dorma.

=== Day 1 – 11 February ===
Biathlon
Michael Greis of Germany wins the first gold medal of the 2006 Winter Olympics, with a victory in the individual 20 km race.
Figure skating
Russian pair Tatiana Totmianina and Maxim Marinin lead after the short program.
Freestyle skiing
Jennifer Heil becomes the first Canadian woman to win a medal in moguls. Norwegian Kari Traa wins the silver and Sandra Laoura of France wins the bronze.
Ice hockey
The Canadian women's hockey team sets an Olympic record for the most lopsided win, beating their Italian hosts 16–0.
Nordic combined
German Georg Hettich picks up the gold medal in Nordic combined.
Speed skating
American Chad Hedrick wins the 5000 m long-track event.

=== Day 2 – 12 February ===
Alpine skiing
Antoine Dénériaz of France wins gold in the men's downhill event.
Cross-country skiing
Estonian Kristina Šmigun wins the women's 7.5 + 7.5 km double pursuit event; a few hours later, Yevgeniy Dementiev secures gold for Russia on the men's 15 km + 15 km distance.
Figure skating
Michelle Kwan of the United States withdraws from the Olympics following a groin injury in practice. Emily Hughes is named her replacement.
Ice hockey
Canada defeats Russia 12–0 in the women's competition. United States defeats Germany.
Luge
Armin Zöggeler of Italy wins the gold in men's singles. Mārtiņš Rubenis of Latvia won his country's first ever Winter Olympic medal, a bronze.
Short track speed skating
Ahn Hyun-soo of South Korea wins gold in the men's 1500 m. His compatriot, Lee Ho-Suk wins silver and Chinese veteran Li Jiajun earns bronze.
Snowboarding
Shaun White of the U.S. team takes the gold medal at the men's snowboarding halfpipe event.
Speed skating
19-year-old Ireen Wüst of the Netherlands wins gold at the women's 3000 m long-track event.
Ski jumping
Lars Bystøl from Norway wins the gold medal at the men's normal hill K95 ski jumping event.

=== Day 3 – 13 February ===
Biathlon
Russian Svetlana Ishmuratova wins the women's 15 km biathlon.
Figure skating
Russian pair Tatiana Totmianina and Maxim Marinin beat two Chinese pairs to take home the gold, posting the only composite score over 200. Chinese pair Zhang Dan and Zhang Hao finish their free skate and win the silver medal, despite a fall and injury to Zhang Dan after their attempt at a quadruple throw.
Snowboarding
Hannah Teter of the U.S. team takes the gold medal at the women's snowboarding halfpipe event. American teammate Gretchen Bleiler wins the silver, with Kjersti Buaas of Norway taking the bronze.
Speed skating
Joey Cheek of the United States wins the gold medal at the 500 m long track event, skating both runs in less than 35 seconds; the fastest time of any other competitor was that of silver medalist Dmitry Dorofeyev, with a 35.17. Lee Kang-seok of Korea wins a bronze medal, the first Korean medal in (long track) speed skating in 14 years.

=== Day 4 – 14 February ===
Alpine skiing
Ted Ligety wins gold for the United States in the men's Combined. Then-leader Bode Miller was disqualified for straddling a gate in the first slalom section; in addition, the leader after the first slalom section, Benjamin Raich, skied off-course in the second section and was also disqualified. Ivica Kostelić of Croatia was second and Rainer Schönfelder of Austria took the bronze.
Biathlon
Sven Fischer of Germany wins the 10 km sprint race.
Cross-country skiing
Sweden's first medal in the 2006 Winter Olympics was brought home by Lina Andersson and Anna Dahlberg, who won the gold medal in women's team sprint, classical style. Minutes later Thobias Fredriksson and Björn Lind did the same in men's team sprint, giving the Swedes a sweep of the event. These were Sweden's first Winter Olympic gold medals since 1994.
Figure skating
Russian Evgeni Plushenko leads after the men's short program. Plushenko's score of 90.66 was the highest for any short program since the current scoring system was adopted in 2003.
Ice hockey
In the women's competition, Canada defeats Sweden 8–1 and will face Finland in the semi-final. USA defeats Finland and will face Sweden in the other semi-final match.
Luge
Germany's Sylke Otto wins gold in the injury-plagued women's luge event while countrywomen Silke Kraushaar and Tatjana Huefner complete the podium.
Speed skating
Svetlana Zhurova of Russia takes gold in the women's 500 m event. Wang Manli and Ren Hui of China win the other two (2) medals.

=== Day 5 – 15 February ===
Alpine skiing
Michaela Dorfmeister of Austria won the women's downhill. Martina Schild of Switzerland and Anja Pärson of Sweden completed the podium.
Freestyle skiing
Dale Begg-Smith of Australia won the men's moguls. Mikko Ronkainen of Finland and Toby Dawson of the United States won silver and bronze, respectively.
Ice hockey
On the first day of men's competition, Canada defeated host Italy 7–2. In upsets, Latvia tied with the USA 3–3 and Slovakia defeated Russia 5–3.
Luge
Austrian brothers Andreas and Wolfgang Linger won the doubles competition. Teams from Germany and Italy took the silver and bronze.
Nordic combined
High winds in the ski jumping hill forced the jury to abandon the team competition midway through the second round. The teams resumed the next day. The Norwegians withdrew due to illness.
Speed skating
Both Canadian men's and ladies' team pursuit teams set new Olympic records, the first of the 2006 Olympic Games. In the men's competition the record was subsequently broken by the Netherlands, and then by Italy.
Short track
China's Wang Meng won her country's first gold at Turin in the women's individual 500 m. Bulgaria's Evgenia Radanova took the silver, while Canada's Anouk Leblanc-Boucher claimed the bronze.

=== Day 6 – 16 February ===
Biathlon
Florence Baverel-Robert of France wins the women's biathlon 7.5 km sprint. Anna Carin Olofsson of Sweden and Lilia Efremova of Ukraine complete the podium. Also, Olga Pyleva of Russia, who placed second at the 15 km on day 3, has been disqualified from the Games following a positive test for carphedon. She has been stripped of her medal.
Cross-country skiing
Kristina Šmigun wins her second gold medal of the Games with a victory in the women's 10 km classical and remains the only Estonian to medal.
Curling
In men's action, Great Britain edges Germany 7–6, Switzerland keeps New Zealand winless by winning 9–7, Canada edges Norway 7–6, and the United States defeats Sweden, 10–6.
Figure skating
Evgeni Plushenko of Russia dominates the competition and takes gold in the men's competition ahead of Switzerland's Stéphane Lambiel and Canada's Jeffrey Buttle. Plushenko sets a world record for the highest score in the free skate since the new scoring system was adopted in 2003.
Ice hockey
The upsets in the men's tournament continue as Switzerland defeats the Czech Republic 3–2.
Nordic combined
Austria wins the men's team competition after Mario Stecher catches up with Germany's Jens Gaiser on the final 5 km leg. Finland wins bronze, finishing nearly a minute ahead of the rest of the field.
Snowboarding
Seth Wescott of the United States wins the inaugural men's snowboard cross competition. Radoslav Židek of Slovakia is second and Paul-Henri de Le Rue of France is third.
Speed skating
The German team of Daniela Anschütz-Thoms, Anni Friesinger and Claudia Pechstein defeats the Canadian team to win gold in the final of the women's team pursuit. Italy wins its first ever Olympic speed skating gold in the men's team pursuit event. The Italians beat the favored Dutch team in the semifinals after Sven Kramer suffers a costly fall. In the final, Italy defeats Canada, which took its second silver in the Oval Lingotto.
Skeleton
Maya Pedersen-Bieri of Switzerland wins gold in the women's final. Shelley Rudman of Great Britain earns silver, the only medal of the games for Great Britain. Mellisa Hollingsworth-Richards of Canada claims bronze.

=== Day 7 – 17 February ===
Cross-country skiing
Estonia gains another gold as Andrus Veerpalu wins the 15 km classical cross-country race ahead of Lukáš Bauer and Tobias Angerer.
Curling
In the men's competition, Great Britain makes short work of Sweden 8–2, while the United States defeats Switzerland 7–4. Finland edges Canada, 6–5.
Figure skating
In the ice dancing competition, the Italian team of Barbara Fusar-Poli and Maurizio Margaglio lead after the compulsory dance, with Russians Tatiana Navka and Roman Kostomarov in second place.
Ice hockey
Sweden scores a victory against the United States in the women's hockey semi-finals after a 3–2 penalty shootout win to advance to the gold medal game. There, they will face Canada, who shut out Finland in the other semi-final.
Snowboarding
Tanja Frieden of Switzerland takes the gold in women's snowboarding cross after Lindsey Jacobellis of the United States falls on the second-to-last jump while performing an unnecessary method grab to give up the largest lead of the entire tournament. Jacobellis settles for silver, while Canada's Dominique Maltais takes bronze after recovering from a crash.
Skeleton
Duff Gibson of Canada takes gold, just ahead of fellow Canadian Jeff Pain. Swiss slider Gregor Stähli wins the bronze. The 39-year-old Gibson becomes the oldest individual gold medalist in Winter Olympics history.

=== Day 8 – 18 February ===
Alpine skiing
Croatian Janica Kostelić takes gold in the women's combined. Austria's Marlies Schild wins the silver and Anja Pärson of Sweden finishes third.
Kjetil André Aamodt wins gold for Norway in the men's Super G, beating Hermann Maier of Austria. Ambrosi Hoffmann takes bronze for the Swiss.
Biathlon
Germans Kati Wilhelm and Martina Glagow finish first and second in the 10 km pursuit; Albina Akhatova of Russia takes bronze.
Vincent Defrasne wins gold for France in the 12.5 km pursuit event, followed closely by Ole Einar Bjørndalen of Norway. Germany's Sven Fischer takes bronze.
Cross-country skiing
Russia wins the 20 km women's relay handily, finishing 10 seconds ahead of silver medalists Germany and 11 seconds ahead of bronze winners Italy.
Curling
In the men's competition, Italy shocks Canada 6–5, while the United States beats Germany 8–5. Great Britain edges Switzerland, 6–5, and Finland takes out Norway 7–3.
Ice hockey
Switzerland stuns Canada 2–0 in the men's competition. Swiss goaltender Martin Gerber has 49 saves in the win. Slovakia defeats the United States 2–1.
Short track speed skating
Jin Sun-Yu and Choi Eun-Kyung of South Korea take gold and silver in the women's 1500 m. China's Wang Meng takes bronze, after the disqualification of third-finished Byun Chun-Sa of Korea.
In the men's 1000 m, Ahn Hyun-soo and Lee Ho-Suk of South Korea take gold and silver with the United States' Apolo Anton Ohno taking the bronze.
Speed skating
The United States takes gold and silver in the men's 1000 m with Shani Davis outskating Joey Cheek for first. Erben Wennemars of the Netherlands receives bronze. Davis' victory makes him the first black person to win an individual gold medal in the history of the Winter Olympics.
Ski jumping
After a disappointing performance on the K90 hill, Austrian ski jumpers Thomas Morgenstern and Andreas Kofler take gold and silver on the large hill, with the smallest possible margin of 0.1 points between them. Norwegian Lars Bystøl, winner of gold on the normal hill, places third, rather far behind the Austrians.

=== Day 9 – 19 February ===
Bobsleigh
The German bob driven by André Lange wins gold in the men's 2-man event 0.21 seconds ahead of the Canadian bob of Pierre Lueders and Lascelles Brown and 0.35 seconds ahead of Martin Annen's Swiss sled. Brown becomes the first Jamaican-born competitor to win a Winter Olympic medal.
Cross-country skiing
Italy takes the gold in the men's 4x10 km relay, with Italian anchor Cristian Zorzi crossing the finish line 15 seconds ahead of the German team. Sweden takes the bronze.
Curling
In the men's competition, the United States surprises Great Britain, 9–8.
Figure skating
In an evening of ice dancing marred by mistakes and falls by other pairs, Russians Tatiana Navka and Roman Kostomarov move into first place during the ice dancing original dance phase. Americans Tanith Belbin and Benjamin Agosto are in second and Ukrainians Elena Grushina and Ruslan Goncharov are in third.
Ice hockey
Finland defeats Canada 2–0 in the men's competition. Slovakia defeats Kazakhstan 2–1, securing the top spot in Group B.
Speed skating
Marianne Timmer of the Netherlands wins the women's 1000 m in 1.16.05, 8 years after winning in Nagano. Cindy Klassen of Canada comes in second and favorite Anni Friesinger of Germany wins the bronze, 0.06 seconds behind Timmer.

=== Day 10 – 20 February ===
Alpine skiing
Benjamin Raich of Austria comes from fifth place in the first run to win the men's giant slalom event after two runs. Joël Chenal of France takes silver, and Hermann Maier of Austria gets another medal with his bronze.
Two hours later, Michaela Dorfmeister wins the women's super-g event and grabs her second gold medal of the Games and giving the Austrians their second gold of the day. Austria also gets its second bronze of the day, as Alexandra Meissnitzer comes in third, behind Croatian powerhouse Janica Kostelić.
Curling
After downing Denmark 8–1, Norway becomes the third team to qualify for the semi-finals in the women's competition, joining Sweden and Switzerland. Canada beats Denmark 9–8, occupying the fourth playoff spot.
In the men's competition, Canada defeats the United States 6–3 to qualify for the semi-finals, and will play the USA again in the first game of the medal round.
Figure skating
Russia continues to dominate on the ice as Tatiana Navka and Roman Kostomarov win the gold in the Ice Dancing competition. Americans Tanith Belbin and Benjamin Agosto win the first U.S. medals in this event since 1976, taking home the silver. Elena Grushina and Ruslan Goncharov of Ukraine earn bronze.
Ice hockey
Canada wins the gold in the women's tournament, defeating Sweden 4–1. The United States shuts out Finland 4–0 in the bronze medal game.
Ski jumping
Austria wins the team event for the first time. Finland takes the silver, while Norway takes the bronze.

=== Day 11 – 21 February ===
Biathlon
The German team takes gold in the men's 4 x 7.5 km relay while teams from Russia and France take silver and bronze, respectively.
Bobsleigh
The German team of Sandra Kiriasis and Anja Schneiderheinze win gold in the women's event ahead of teams from the United States (Shauna Rohbock and Valerie Fleming) and Italy (Gerda Weissensteiner and Jennifer Isacco).
Figure skating
Sasha Cohen of the United States leads after the women's short program, with Russian Irina Slutskaya three-hundredths of a point behind. Shizuka Arakawa of Japan is third.
Ice hockey
Slovakia defeats Sweden 3–0, winning every match in Group B and moving on to the quarterfinals, along with Russia, Sweden and the United States. In Group A, Finland, Switzerland, Canada and the Czech Republic all move on to the quarterfinals.
Nordic combined
Felix Gottwald of Austria wins gold in the LH Sprint competition while Norway's Magnus Moan and Germany's Georg Hettich finish in the silver and bronze positions.
Speed skating
Italian Enrico Fabris wins gold in the men's 1500 m ahead of feuding American teammates Shani Davis and Chad Hedrick, who take silver and bronze.

=== Day 12 – 22 February ===
Alpine skiing
Anja Pärson of Sweden wins her first Olympic gold medal in the women's slalom; her fifth career medal. Austrians Nicole Hosp and Marlies Schild take silver and bronze.
Cross-country skiing
Chandra Crawford of Canada wins a gold medal in her Olympic debut in the women's 1.1 km sprint. Germany's Claudia Künzel edges out Russia's Alena Sidko to earn the silver.
Björn Lind of Sweden claims the gold medal in the men's sprint in a rout. Frenchman Roddy Darragon edges out Swede Thobias Fredriksson to earn the silver.
Curling
In the men's semifinals, Canada earns 5 points against the United States team in the 9th end, securing it a place in the final against Finland, who beat Great Britain 4–3. In the women's semi-finals. Sweden edges out Norway 5–4, while Switzerland beats Canada 7–5.
Freestyle skiing
In the women's aerials Evelyne Leu of Switzerland wins the gold medal, ahead of Li Nina of China and Australian Alisa Camplin.
Ice hockey
Russia defeats Canada 2–0, moving on to the semi-finals to play the Fins, who beat the United States 4–3. The Czech Republic defeats Slovakia 3–1 and will play Sweden, who beat Switzerland 6–2, in the quarter-finals.
Short track speed skating
South Korea wins the gold medal in the women's 3,000 m relay, while Canada takes silver, and Italy bronze.
Snowboarding
Philipp Schoch of Switzerland bests his older brother Simon Schoch in the final of the men's parallel giant slalom to successfully defend his Olympic gold medal. Siegfried Grabner of Austria takes bronze.
Speed skating
Canadians Cindy Klassen and Kristina Groves finish one-two in the women's 1,500 m competition, with Klassen winning by 1.47 seconds. Ireen Wüst of the Netherlands takes bronze.

=== Day 13 – 23 February ===
Biathlon
Despite missing veteran Olga Pyleva, who failed an anti-doping test earlier in these Games, the Russian team of Albina Akhatova, Anna Bogaliy, Svetlana Ishmuratova and Olga Zaitseva leads from start to finish in the 4x6 km relay, posting a gold medal-winning time of 1:16:12.5. Two-time defending gold medalists from Germany finish 50.7 seconds behind for the silver. The French team take the bronze, more than two minutes back.
Curling
The Swedish women's team skipped by Anette Norberg win the gold medal match against Switzerland with a 7–6 double take out on the hammer of the 11th end. Canada defeats Norway in the bronze medal match 11–5.
Figure skating
Shizuka Arakawa of Japan performs a conservative but clean free skate to defeat Sasha Cohen of the United States and Irina Slutskaya of Russia, who both suffer falls and take silver and bronze, respectively. Arakawa's win gives Japan their first medal in Turin, as well as Japan's first figure skating gold.
Freestyle skiing
China's Han Xiaopeng wins gold in men's aerials by a little more than two points over Dmitri Dashinski of Belarus. Vladimir Lebedev of Russia wins bronze.
Snowboarding
Defending World Cup champion Daniela Meuli of Switzerland wins gold in the women's parallel giant slalom, with Germany's Amelie Kober taking the silver and American Rosey Fletcher the bronze.

=== Day 14 – 24 February ===
Alpine skiing
American Julia Mancuso captures gold in the women's giant slalom. Finland's Tanja Poutiainen wins the silver, the country's first Olympic medal in the sport and Swede Anna Ottosson wins the bronze.
Cross-country skiing
Kateřina Neumannová of the Czech Republic wins the 30 km freestyle event. Russian Julija Tchepalova claims the silver and Pole Justyna Kowalczyk gets the bronze.
Curling
Canada defeats Finland 10–4 in the gold medal match to win the nation's first gold medal in men's curling after winning silver in Nagano and Salt Lake City. The United States men's team defeats Great Britain by a score of 8–6 to take the bronze medal, America's first medal in curling.
Figure skating
Traditional gala evening at Palavela to conclude the figure skating events. Russian pair Tatiana Totmianina and Maxim Marinin and Evgeni Plushenko skate accompanied by Edwin Marton at the violin, playing from the ice.
Ice hockey
In the men's competition, Sweden defeats the Czech Republic 7–3 to advance to the gold medal game. In the other semifinal, Finland beats Russia 4–0. Sweden and Finland will face off in the gold medal game, while the Czech Republic will face Russia in the bronze medal game.
Speed skating
Bob de Jong of the Netherlands, the reigning world champion, sets the winning time at 13:01.57 for the gold medal in the 10000 m event. American Chad Hedrick skates to a silver medal, and the bronze goes to Carl Verheijen, also of the Netherlands.

=== Day 15 – 25 February ===
Alpine skiing
An Austrian team sweep in the men's slalom with gold for Benjamin Raich, silver for Reinfried Herbst, bronze for Rainer Schönfelder.
Biathlon
Michael Greis of Germany wins the men's 15 km free gold medal. Tomasz Sikora of Poland wins the silver and Ole Einar Bjørndalen the bronze.
Anna Carin Olofsson of Sweden wins the women's 12.5 km free gold with Kati Wilhelm of Germany taking the silver and her compatriot Uschi Disl capturing the bronze.
Bobsleigh
The German bob driven by André Lange wins gold in the 4-man event 0.13 seconds ahead of the Russian bob driven by Alexandre Zoubkov and 0.41 seconds ahead of Martin Annen's Swiss sled.
Ice hockey
In the men's competition, the Czech Republic defeats Russia 3–0 to win the bronze medal game.
Short track speed skating
American Apolo Anton Ohno wins the men's 500 m, earning his second career gold medal. Canada's François-Louis Tremblay wins the silver, while Ahn Hyun-soo of South Korea wins bronze, earning his third individual medal of the Olympics.

South Korea's Jin Sun-Yu wins her third gold of the Games in the women's 1000 m. Chinese women Wang Meng and Yang Yang (A) take the silver and bronze respectively after 1500 m silver medalist Choi Eun-Kyung, who originally finished third, is disqualified.

South Korea wins the gold medal in the men's 5000 m relay, Canada takes the silver, while the United States gets bronze. Ahn Hyun-soo wins his third gold medal of the Games, medaling in every men's short track event and bringing his total number of medals in Torino to four. Ahn and Jin become the first Korean athletes to win three gold medals in a single Olympics.
Speed skating
Clara Hughes of Canada sets the winning time at 6:59.07 for the gold medal in the 5000 m event. German Claudia Pechstein skates to a silver medal, and the bronze goes to another Canadian, Cindy Klassen, who wins her fifth medal of these Games.

=== Day 16 – Closing ceremony – 26 February ===
Cross-country skiing
Giorgio Di Centa of Italy wins the 50 km freestyle event. Russian Yevgeny Dementyev claims the silver and Austrian Mikhail Botvinov gets the bronze. The medals are presented during the closing ceremony.
Ice hockey
Sweden defeats Finland 3–2 to take the men's ice hockey gold medal, with Nicklas Lidström scoring the deciding goal in the final. The Czech Republic takes the bronze after beating Russia.
Closing ceremony
Manuela Di Centa gives the gold medal to her brother Giorgio.

== See also ==
- Chronological summary of the 2010 Winter Olympics
