= Mariya Prusakova =

Mariya or Maria Prusakova may refer to:

- Maria Prusakova (politician) (born 1983), Russian politician
- Mariya Prusakova (snowboarder) (born 1989), Russian snowboarder
