= Chikako =

- Gender: Female

Origin
- Origin: Japanese
- Meaning: Different meanings depending on the kanji used

Chikako (written: 智佳子, 智香子 or 知何子) is a feminine Japanese given name. Notable people with the name include:

- Chikako, Princess Kazu (1846–1877) the wife of 14th shōgun Tokugawa Iemochi
- Chikako Akimoto (秋元 千賀子; born 1949), Japanese voice actress
- Chikako Asō (麻生 千賀子; born 1950), Japanese businesswoman
- Fujiwara no Chikako (藤原親子), Japanese noblewoman and waka poet
- Chikako Fushimi (伏見 知何子; born 1974), Japanese snowboarder
- Chikako Kumamae (熊前 知加子; born 1974), Japanese female volleyball player
- Chikako Matsumoto (松本 慈子; born 1999), Japanese member of SKE48
- Chikako Mese American mathematician
- Minamoto no Chikako (源 親子), was the daughter of Kitabatake Morochika
- Chikako Murakami (basketball) (村上 睦子; born 1970), Japanese basketball player
- Chikako Murakami (村上 智佳子), Japanese tennis player
- Chikako Nagasawa (長沢 千和子; born 1964), Japanese women's professional shogi player
- Chikako Nakamori (中森 智佳子; born 1967), Japanese swimmer
- Chikako Nakayama (中山 智香子; born 1975), Japanese badminton player
- Chikako Urano (浦野 千賀子; born 1946), Japanese mangaka
- Chikako Watanabe, Japanese member of NaNa (band)
- Chikako Yamashiro (山城 知佳子; born 1976), Japanese filmmaker and video artist

== See also ==
- 4577 Chikako, a main-belt asteroid
