= Itaru Chimura =

Japanese snowboarder (born 1975)

Personal information
- Nationality: Japanese
- Born: 15 April 1975 (age 49); Nagano, Japan

Sport
- Sport: Snowboarding

Itaru Chimura (born 15 April 1975) is a Japanese snowboarder. He competed in the men's snowboard cross event at the 2006 Winter Olympics.
