= Graham Watanabe =

American snowboarder (born 1982)

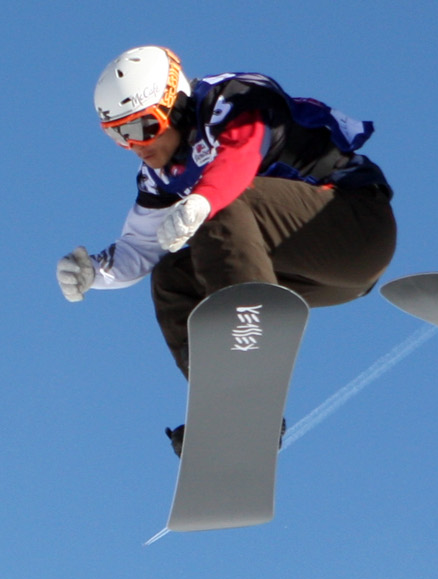
- Watanabe at Telluride in 2009

Medal record

Men's snowboarding

Representing the United States

Winter X Games
Silver medal – second place	2009 Aspen	Snowboard Cross

Graham Watanabe (born March 19, 1982) is an American snowboarder who has competed since 1996. He won three events in snowboardcross between 2004 and 2009.

At the 2006 Winter Olympics in Turin, Watanabe finished 31st in the snowboard cross event. His best finish at the FIS Snowboard World Championships was sixth in the snowboard cross event at Gangwon in 2009.

It was announced on 26 January 2010, that Watanabe made the US team for the 2010 Winter Olympics. Although Watanabe did not qualify for the quarter-finals in Vancouver, he described his Olympic experience, when he said, "Try to imagine Pegasus mating with a unicorn and the creature that they birth; I somehow tame it and ride it into the sky in the clouds and sunshine and rainbows. That's what it feels like."

He was a subject in an episode of BYU Television's The Generations Project documentary series in 2012.
