= Romina Masolini =

Italian snowboarder

Personal information
- Nationality: Italian
- Born: 4 November 1976 (age 48); Morbegno, Italy

Sport
- Country: Italy
- Sport: Snowboarding

Romina Masolini (born 4 November 1976) is an Italian snowboarder.

She was born in Morbegno. She competed at the 2006 Winter Olympics, in halfpipe.

She has been known to use Santa Cruz snowboards and Northwave boots
