= Snowboarding at the 2006 Winter Olympics – Women's halfpipe =

Women's halfpipe at the XX Olympic Winter Games
- Venue: Bardonecchia
- Date: 13 February 2006
- Competitors: 34 from 16 nations
- Winning score: 46.4

Medalists
1st place, gold medalist(s)		Hannah Teter	United States
2nd place, silver medalist(s)		Gretchen Bleiler	United States
3rd place, bronze medalist(s)		Kjersti Buaas	Norway

The women's halfpipe event in snowboarding at the 2006 Winter Olympics was held in Bardonecchia, a village in the Province of Turin, Italy. Competition took place on 13 February 2006.

== Results ==
Rank	Name	Qualification			Final	
Rank	Name	Run 1	Run 2	Rank	Run 1	Run 2
Gold medal	Hannah Teter (USA)	39.9	—	3	~~44.6~~	46.4
Silver medal	Gretchen Bleiler (USA)	41.6	—	2	~~41.5~~	43.4
Bronze medal	Kjersti Buaas (NOR)	19.2	41.9	8	~~40.9~~	42.0
4	Kelly Clark (USA)	44.9	—	1	41.1	~~38.1~~
5	Torah Bright (AUS)	32.0	43.1	7	~~17.0~~	41.0
6	Elena Hight (USA)	33.1	36.8	10	~~29.4~~	37.8
7	Manuela Laura Pesko (SUI)	7.1	36.9	9	35.9	~~14.2~~
8	Doriane Vidal (FRA)	34.5	—	6	~~26.1~~	35.7
9	Shiho Nakashima (JPN)	35.5	—	5	33.1	~~30.6~~
10	Soko Yamaoka (JPN)	28.5	35.6	11	~~22.4~~	32.7
11	Cheryl Maas (NED)	38.6	—	4	~~8.7~~	16.5
12	Chikako Fushimi (JPN)	13.0	34.8	12	~~9.5~~	15.6
13	Sophie Rodriguez (FRA)	33.9	33.8	13		
14	Tania Detomas (ITA)	29.7	33.6	14		
15	Sarah Conrad (CAN)	19.4	33.5	15		
16	Juliane Bray (NZL)	17.1	32.2	16		
17	Paulina Ligocka (POL)	31.8	31.8	17		
18	Holly Crawford (AUS)	19.0	29.9	18		
19	Cecile Alzina (FRA)	25.7	28.0	19		
20	Kate Foster (GBR)	16.4	24.7	20		
21	Dominique Vallee (CAN)	31.5	24.5	21		
22	Anna Olofsson (SWE)	27.4	24.4	22		
23	Maëlle Ricker (CAN)	25.9	23.2	23		
24	Kendal Brown (NZL)	22.9	22.4	24		
25	Romina Masolini (ITA)	12.7	20.5	25		
26	Queralt Castellet (ESP)	20.5	18.3	26		
27	Mercedes Nicoll (CAN)	33.0	17.5	27		
28	Lei Pan (CHN)	15.6	16.0	28		
29	Svetlana Vinogradova (RUS)	6.9	13.8	29		
30	Clara Villoslada (ESP)	10.3	11.4	30		
31	Zhifeng Sun (CHN)	11.3	10.2	31		
32	Mariya Prusakova (RUS)	8.5	8.2	32		
33	Lesley McKenna (GBR)	1.4	5.2	33		
34	Melo Imai (JPN)	7.2	1.4	34		
