= Mattias Blomberg =

Swedish snowboarder (born 1976)

Personal information
- Nationality: Swedish
- Born: 1 April 1976 (age 48); Falun, Sweden

Sport
- Sport: Snowboarding

Mattias Blomberg (born 1 April 1976) is a Swedish snowboarder. He competed in the men's snowboard cross event at the 2006 Winter Olympics.
