= Jonte Grundelius =

Swedish snowboarder

Personal information
- Nationality: Swedish
- Born: 26 December 1975 (age 49); Västerås, Sweden

Sport
- Sport: Snowboarding

Jonte Grundelius (born 26 December 1975) is a Swedish snowboarder. He competed in the men's snowboard cross event at the 2006 Winter Olympics.
