= Chronological summary of the 2010 Summer Youth Olympics =

This page is a chronological summary of the 2010 Summer Youth Olympics, the inaugural Youth Olympic Games, held in Singapore.

== Calendar ==
●	Opening ceremony	●	Event competitions	●	Event finals	●	Closing ceremony

August	12th	13th	14th	15th	16th	17th	18th	19th	20th	21st	22nd	23rd	24th	25th	26th	Total gold medals
Ceremonies			●												●	
Aquatics (Diving)										1	1	1	1			4
Aquatics (Swimming)				3	8	4	7	3	9							34
Archery								1	1	1						3
Athletics										12	12	12				36
Badminton								2								2
Basketball												2				2
Boxing														11		11
Canoeing											3			3		6
Cycling											1					1
Equestrian									1				1			2
Fencing				2	2	2	1									7
Field hockey													1	1		2
Football													1	1		2
Gymnastics (Artistic)							1	1		5	5					12
Gymnastics (Rhythmic)														2		2
Gymnastics (Trampoline)									2							2
Handball														2		2
Judo										3	3	2		1		9
Modern pentathlon										1	1		1			3
Rowing							4									4
Sailing														4		4
Shooting											1	1	1	1		4
Table tennis												2			1	3
Taekwondo				2	2	2	2	2								10
Tennis									1	3						4
Triathlon				1	1			1								3
Volleyball (Indoor)															2	2
Weightlifting				2	2	3	3	1								11
Wrestling				5	4	5										14
Total gold medals				15	19	16	18	11	14	26	27	20	6	26	3	201
Cumulative gold medals				15	34	50	68	79	93	119	146	166	172	198	201	201

== Pre-Games ==
2001

- International Olympic Committee (IOC) president Jacques Rogge announced plans for an Olympic Games for youths aged 14 to 18.

July 2007

- IOC members at the 119th IOC session in Guatemala City, Guatemala ratified the proposal for the Youth Olympic Games, the first of which would be held in 2010.
- Bidding for the 1st Summer Youth Olympics in 2010 was opened to the National Olympic Committees (NOCs).

21 January 2008

- A postal vote by the International Olympic Committee Executive Board io the week before saw Moscow and Singapore being shortlisted to host the Games, defeating the three other candidates, Athens, Bangkok and Turin.

21 February 2008

- Singapore won the bid to host the first Youth Olympic Games, winning finalist Moscow with a vote of 53 to 44 by International Olympic Committee members.

2 August 2008

- The first Youth Olympic Village was moved from the National University of Singapore's University Town to the campus of Nanyang Technological University, with SYOGOC citing rising construction costs.

21 November 2009

- The official mascots of the Games, Lyo and Merly, were announced. They were introduced by Minister for Community Development, Youth and Sports Dr Vivian Balakrishnan at Suntec City in Singapore.

30 May 2010

- Everyone, the official theme song of the Games, written by local producer Ken Lim and sung by five artistes from the five continents, premiered worldwide.

23 July 2010

- The first ever Youth Olympic Flame was lit in Ancient Olympia, Greece, beginning the round-the-world journey spanning the five continents up till 5 August.

5 August 2010

- The Youth Olympic Flame (JYOF) arrived in Singapore ahead of the Games to be held nine days later. The torch will travel for six days around the island country.

== Games ==
12 August 2010

- The girls' football preliminary round was the first sport to begin, commencing before the opening ceremony.

=== Day 1 (August 14) ===
Opening ceremony

- The Olympic cauldron was lit by Singaporean sailor Darren Choy, signalling the commencement of the inaugural Youth Olympic Games.

=== Day 2 (August 15) ===
Triathlon

- Yuka Sato of Japan won the first ever gold medal at the Youth Olympic Games, in the girls' triathlon event.

=== Day 3 (August 16) ===
Taekwondo

- Host nation Singapore received its first medal at the Youth Olympics when taekwondo exponent Daryl Tan entered the semi-finals, virtually guaranteeing him a bronze medal at the least.

=== Day 4 (August 17) ===
Weightlifting

- Chinese weightlifter Deng Wei won the women's 58-kilogram event, setting a new junior world record in the process.

=== Day 6 (August 19) ===
Archery

- Korean archer Kwak Ye-ji broke the outdoor junior women's world record with a score of 670 in the 70m (72 arrows) ranking round, breaking the previous record of 666 set compatriot Um Hye-Rang in 2001, and was three points away from the Olympic record set by Ukrainian Lina Herasymenko.

=== Day 13 (August 26) ===
Closing ceremony held at The Float@Marina Bay.

== See also ==
- Chronological summary of the 2010 Winter Olympics
