= Alex Kupprion =

German snowboarder

Personal information
- Nationality: German
- Born: 12 July 1978 (age 46); Singen, West Germany

Sport
- Sport: Snowboarding

Alex Kupprion (born 12 July 1978) is a German former snowboarder. He competed in the men's snowboard cross event at the 2006 Winter Olympics.
