= Michael Layer =

German snowboarder

Personal information
- Nationality: German
- Born: 23 October 1978 (age 46); Heilbronn, Germany

Sport
- Sport: Snowboarding

Michael Layer (born 23 October 1978) is a German former snowboarder. He competed in the men's snowboard cross event at the 2006 Winter Olympics.
