= Tommaso Tagliaferri =

Italian snowboarder

Personal information
- Nationality: Italian
- Born: 21 September 1982 (age 42); Giussano, Italy

Sport
- Sport: Snowboarding

Tommaso Tagliaferri (born 21 September 1982) is an Italian snowboarder. He competed in the men's snowboard cross event at the 2006 Winter Olympics.
