= Tom Velisek =

Canadian snowboarder

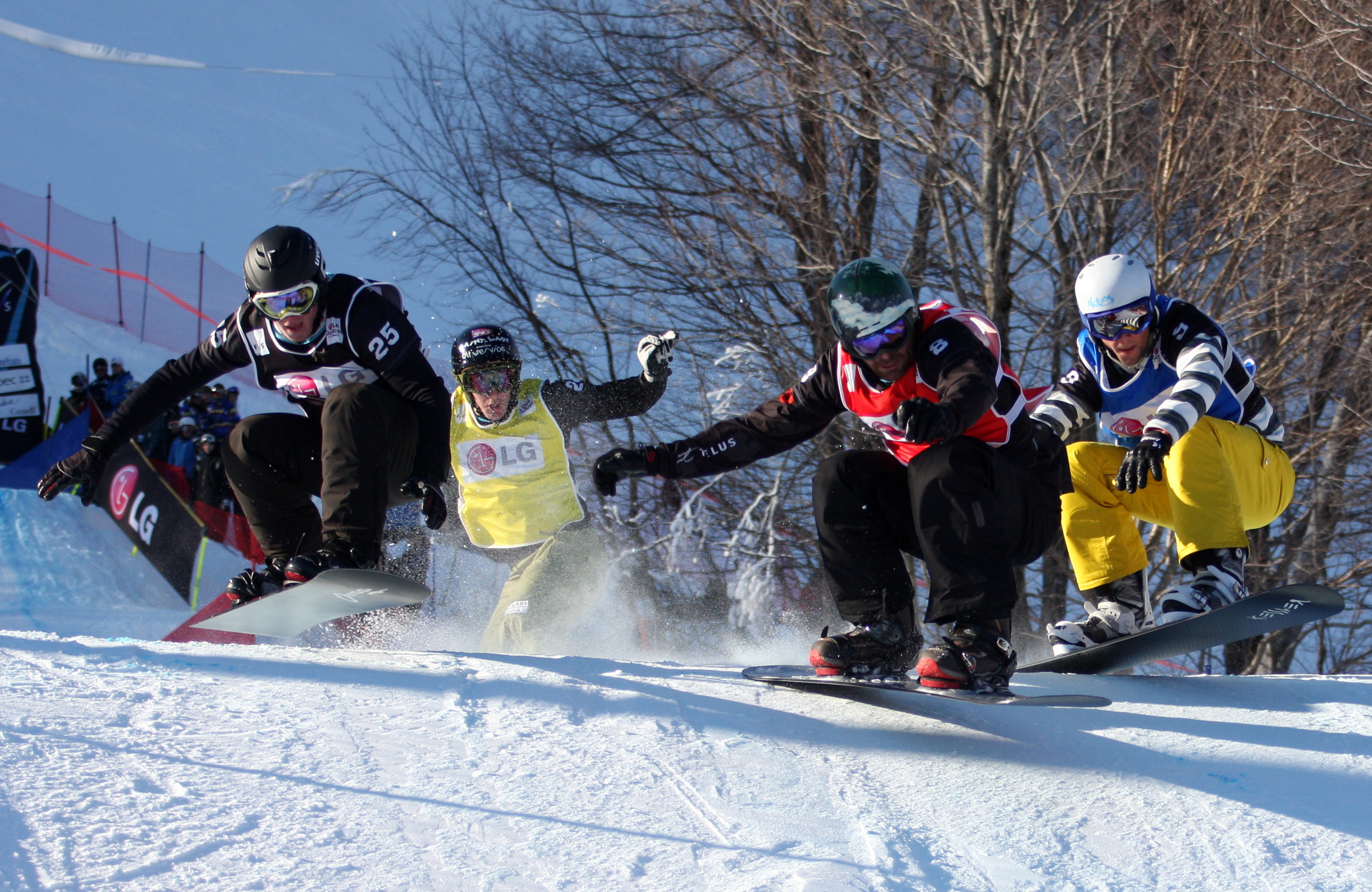
Andrey Boldykov, Paul-Henri de Le Rue, Tom Velisek, Kevin Hill. Telluride, January 21, 2010

Tom Velisek (born January 15, 1981, in Nelson, British Columbia) is a Canadian snowboarder, specializing in the snowboard cross event.

Velisek made his World Cup debut in December 2001 at Whistler, BC. His first World Cup podium came in January 2003, when he won bronze at an event in Berchtesgaden, and his first, and to date, only victory was in 2004, at Bad Gastein.

Velisek's best World Cup season came in 2004, when he placed 6th overall in the snowboard cross standings. He has competed at four FIS Snowboarding World Championships, with his best finish a 4th in 2009.

Velisek competed at the 2006 Winter Olympics, in the snowboard cross. He placed 18th in the qualifying rounds, advancing him to the 1/8 finals, but a third-place finish in his heat meant he did not advance any further, leaving him 23rd overall.

His sister Billie is known for competition ski mountaineering.

== World Cup podiums ==
Date	Location	Rank
January 25, 2003	Berchtesgaden	3rd place, bronze medalist(s)
January 5, 2004	Bad Gastein	1st place, gold medalist(s)
January 5, 2006	Bad Gastein	3rd place, bronze medalist(s)
March 1, 2008	Lake Placid	3rd place, bronze medalist(s)
