= Tania Detomas =

Italian snowboarder (born 1985)

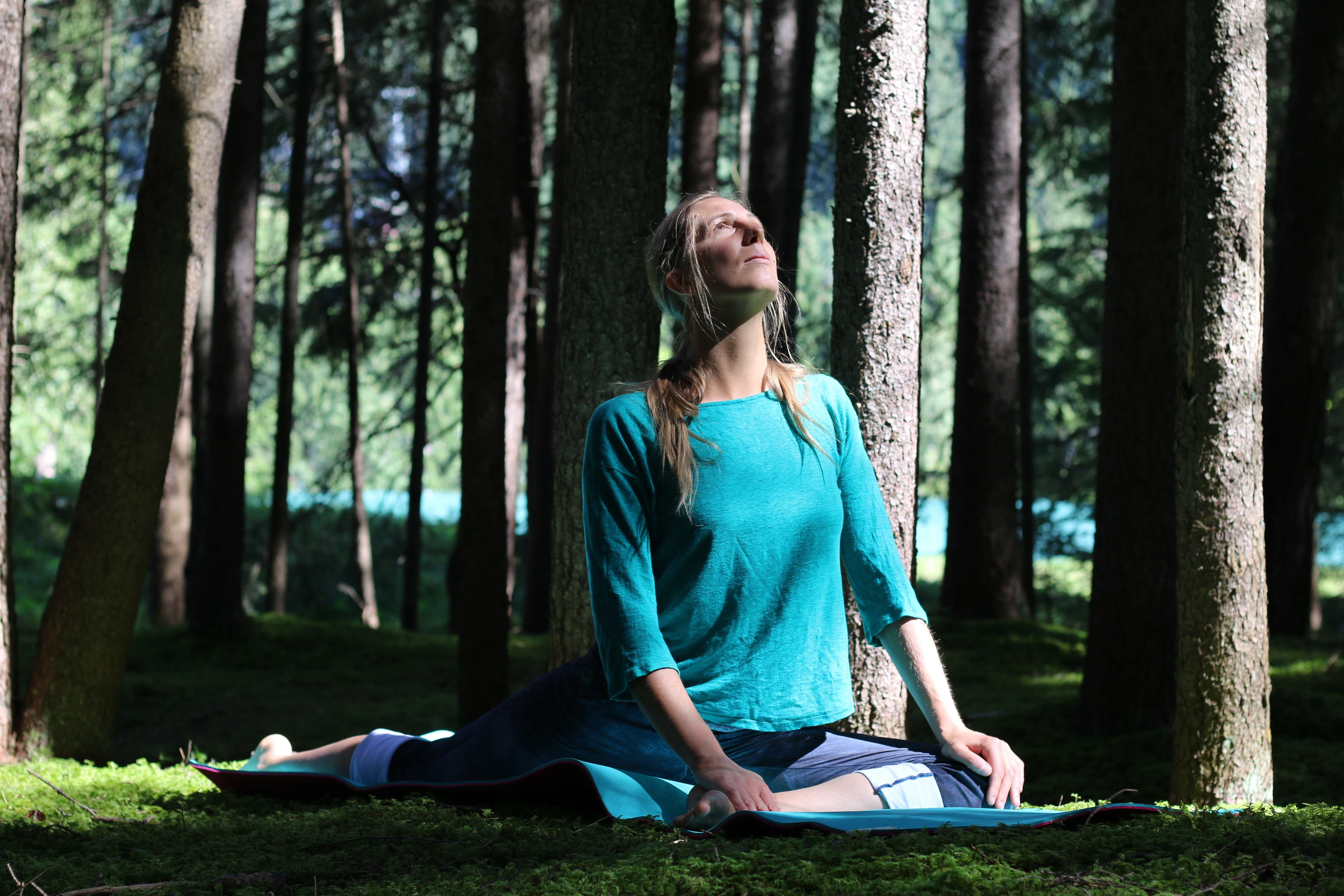
- Tania Detomas in 2019

Personal information
- Nationality: Italian
- Born: 10 August 1985 (age 39); Cavalese, Italy

Sport
- Country: Italy
- Sport: Snowboarding

Tania Detomas (born 10 August 1985) is an Italian snowboarder. She was born in Cavalese. She competed at the 2006 Winter Olympics, in halfpipe.
