= Hans-Jörg Unterrainer =

Austrian snowboarder

Personal information
- Nationality: Austrian
- Born: 15 April 1980 (age 46) Salzburg, Austria

Sport
- Sport: Snowboarding

Hans-Jörg Unterrainer (born 15 April 1980) is an Austrian former snowboarder. He competed in the men's snowboard cross event at the 2006 Winter Olympics. He now works as a sommelier and chef.
