= Marco Huser =

Swiss snowboarder

Personal information
- Nationality: Swiss
- Born: 12 November 1979 (age 45); Leuggelbach, Switzerland

Sport
- Sport: Snowboarding

Marco Huser (born 12 November 1979) is a Swiss snowboarder. He competed in the men's snowboard cross event at the 2006 Winter Olympics.
