= Rafał Skarbek-Malczewski =

Polish snowboarder

Personal information
- Nationality: Polish
- Born: 7 October 1982 (age 42); Cieszyn, Poland

Sport
- Sport: Snowboarding

Rafał Skarbek-Malczewski (born 7 October 1982) is a Polish snowboarder. He competed in the men's snowboard cross event at the 2006 Winter Olympics.
