= Chronological summary of the 2010 Winter Olympics =

This article contains a chronological summary of major events from the 2010 Winter Olympics in Vancouver, Canada.

== Calendar ==
In the following calendar for the 2010 Winter Olympic Games, each blue box represents an event competition, such as a qualification round, on that day. The yellow boxes represent days during which medal-awarding finals for a sport are held. The number in each box represents the number of finals that were contested on that day.

OC	Opening ceremony	●	Event competitions	1	Event finals	EG	Exhibition gala	CC	Closing ceremony

February	12th Fri	13th Sat	14th Sun	15th Mon	16th Tue	17th Wed	18th Thu	19th Fri	20th Sat	21st Sun	22nd Mon	23rd Tue	24th Wed	25th Thu	26th Fri	27th Sat	28th Sun	Events
Ceremonies	OC																CC	—N/a
Alpine skiing				1		1	1	1	1	1		1	●	1	1	1		10
Biathlon		1	1		2		2			2		1			1			10
Bobsleigh									●	1		●	1		●	1		3
Cross country skiing				2		2		1	1		2		1	1		1	1	12
Curling					●	●	●	●	●	●	●	●	●	●	1	1		2
Figure skating			●	1	●		1	●		●	1	●		1		EG		4
Freestyle skiing		1	1						●	1	●	1	1	1				6
Ice hockey		●	●	●	●	●	●	●	●	●	●	●	●	1	●	●	1	2
Luge		●	1	●	1	1												3
Nordic combined			1									1		1				3
Short track speed skating		1				1			2				1		3			8
Skeleton							●	2										2
Ski jumping	●	1						●	1		1							3
Snowboarding				1	1	1	1								1	1		6
Speed skating		1	1	1	1	1	1		1	1		1	1		●	2		12
Daily medal events		5	5	6	5	7	6	4	6	6	4	5	5	6	7	7	2	86
Cumulative total		5	10	16	21	28	34	38	44	50	54	59	64	70	77	84	86	86
February	12th Fri	13th Sat	14th Sun	15th Mon	16th Tue	17th Wed	18th Thu	19th Fri	20th Sat	21st Sun	22nd Mon	23rd Tue	24th Wed	25th Thu	26th Fri	27th Sat	28th Sun	Total events

== Day 1 – February 12 (Opening ceremony) ==
Death of Nodar Kumaritashvili

- Georgian luger Nodar Kumaritashvili died during training, shortly before the games officially opened.

Opening ceremony

- In front of 60,000 attendants, Governor General Michaëlle Jean declared the games officially open. Performers at the ceremony included 300+ cultural dancers from First Nation, Inuit and Métis communities from across Canada, Nelly Furtado, Bryan Adams, Sarah McLachlan, Nikki Yanofsky, k.d. lang and Garou. The Olympic Flame was lit by Catriona Le May Doan, Steve Nash, Nancy Greene, Rick Hansen and Wayne Gretzky.

== Day 2 – February 13 ==
Alpine skiing

- Due to poor weather conditions, the men's downhill is postponed until February 15.

Freestyle skiing

- Hannah Kearney of the United States wins the women's moguls event, while defending champion Jenn Heil of Canada wins silver.

Short track speed skating

- Lee Jung-Su of South Korea wins the men's 1500 metres event. His two teammates crashed just seconds from the end allowing Americans Apolo Ohno and John Celski to capture silver and bronze.

Biathlon

- Anastasiya Kuzmina of Slovakia wins the women's sprint event, winning independent Slovakia's first ever winter gold medal.

Ski jumping

- Simon Ammann of Switzerland wins the first gold medal awarded of the games in normal hill individual ski jump. Ammann had previously won gold in the same event at the 2002 Winter Olympics.

Speed skating

- Sven Kramer of the Netherlands wins the 5000 metres men's speed skating event, setting a new Olympic record in 6:14.60.

Gold medalists
Sport	Event	Competitor(s)	NOC	Rec	Ref
Biathlon	Women's sprint	Anastasiya Kuzmina	Slovakia		
Freestyle	Women's moguls	Hannah Kearney	United States		
Short track	Men's 1500 metres	Lee Jung-Su	South Korea		
Ski jumping	Normal hill individual	Simon Ammann	Switzerland		
Speed skating	Men's 5000 metres	Sven Kramer	Netherlands	OR	

== Day 3 – February 14 ==
Biathlon

- Vincent Jay of France wins men's sprint.

Freestyle skiing

- Alexandre Bilodeau of Canada wins men's moguls, the first Olympic gold won by a Canadian on home soil.

Luge

- Felix Loch of Germany wins men's singles with the fastest time in each of the four runs.

Nordic combined

- Jason Lamy-Chappuis of France wins individual normal hill/10 km. He beat American Johnny Spillane by 0.4 seconds, the closest finish in Olympic Nordic combined history. The silver for United States and bronze for Italy are their first Olympic medals in Nordic combined.

Speed skating

- Martina Sáblíková of the Czech Republic wins women's 3000 metres.

Gold medalists
Sport	Event	Competitor(s)	NOC	Rec	Ref
Biathlon	Men's sprint	Vincent Jay	France		
Freestyle skiing	Men's moguls	Alexandre Bilodeau	Canada		
Luge	Men's singles	Felix Loch	Germany		
Nordic combined	Individual normal hill/10 km	Jason Lamy-Chappuis	France		
Speed skating	Women's 3000 metres	Martina Sáblíková	Czech Republic		

== Day 4 – February 15 ==
Alpine skiing

- Didier Défago of Switzerland wins men's downhill with a time of 1:54.31. Aksel Lund Svindal of Norway took the silver with 1:54.38 and Bode Miller of the United States took the bronze with 1:54.40. The time difference of 0.09 seconds between gold and bronze is the smallest in the history of the men's Olympic downhill event.

Cross-country

- Charlotte Kalla of Sweden wins women's 10 km freestyle. She was Sweden's first female individual gold medalist in cross-country skiing at the Winter Olympics since 1968.
- Dario Cologna of Switzerland wins men's 15 km freestyle. It is Switzerland's first gold medal in cross-country skiing at the Winter Olympics.

Figure skating

- Shen Xue and Zhao Hongbo of China win pair skating, setting world records for the short program and overall scores. This is China's first Olympic gold medal ever in a figure skating event. For the Soviet Union, Unified Team and Russia, it was the end of their longest winning streak in the sport, which started during the 1964 Innsbruck Winter Olympics.

Snowboarding

- Seth Wescott of the United States wins men's snowboard cross.

Speed skating

- Mo Tae-bum of South Korea wins men's 500 m race. This is Korea's first ever gold medal in Winter Olympics outside short track speed skating.

Gold medalists
Sport	Event	Competitor(s)	NOC	Rec	Ref
Alpine skiing	Men's downhill	Didier Défago	Switzerland		
Cross-country skiing	Women's 10 km freestyle	Charlotte Kalla	Sweden		
Cross-country skiing	Men's 15 km freestyle	Dario Cologna	Switzerland		
Figure skating	Pair skating	Shen Xue and Zhao Hongbo	China	WR	
Snowboarding	Men's snowboard cross	Seth Wescott	United States		
Speed skating	Men's 500 metres	Mo Tae-bum	South Korea		

== Day 5 – February 16 ==
Biathlon

- Magdalena Neuner of Germany wins the gold medal for the women's 10 km pursuit with a time of 30:16.0. Anastasiya Kuzmina of Slovakia wins the silver with a time of +12.3 over the leader, and Marie-Laure Brunet of France earns the bronze with a time of +28.3 over the leader.
- Björn Ferry of Sweden wins gold in the men's pursuit in a time of 33:38.4. Austrian Christoph Sumann takes silver and France's Vincent Jay bronze.

Luge

- German Tatjana Hüfner wins the women's singles.

Snowboarding

- Maëlle Ricker of Canada wins gold in the women's snowboard cross, Déborah Anthonioz of France wins silver and Olivia Nobs of Switzerland wins bronze.

Speed skating

- Lee Sang-hwa of South Korea wins women's 500 m race beating the current world record holder Jenny Wolf of Germany, with whom she was paired, by 0.05 seconds.

Gold medalists
Sport	Event	Competitor(s)	NOC	Rec	Ref
Biathlon	Women's 10 km pursuit	Magdalena Neuner	Germany		
Biathlon	Men's 12.5 km pursuit	Björn Ferry	Sweden		
Luge	Women's singles	Tatjana Hüfner	Germany		
Snowboarding	Women's snowboard cross	Maëlle Ricker	Canada		
Speed skating	Women's 500 m	Lee Sang-hwa	South Korea		

== Day 6 – February 17 ==
Alpine skiing

- Lindsey Vonn of the U.S. wins the gold medal in the women's downhill, the first of five events in which she will compete.

Cross-country skiing

- Russian Nikita Kriukov wins the men's sprint ahead of compatriot Alexander Panzhinskiy after a photo finish. Norway's Marit Bjørgen wins the women's sprint while Petra Majdič takes bronze despite skiing with four ribs broken during warm-ups.

Luge

- Austrian brothers Andreas and Wolfgang Linger retain the luge doubles title that they won in the 2006 Games.

Short track

- Wang Meng of China repeats her gold medal performance in the 500 m from the 2006 Winter Olympics.

Snowboarding

- Shaun White of the U.S. team takes the gold medal at the men's snowboarding halfpipe event, performing a double McTwist 1260 to set a score of 48.4 points out of 50.

Speed skating

- Shani Davis of the United States wins gold in 1000 m becoming the first man to win this event twice. Mo Tae-bum of South Korea and Chad Hedrick of the United States were paired together and won silver and bronze respectively, 0.38 seconds separated gold from bronze.

Gold medalists
Sport	Event	Competitor(s)	NOC	Rec	Ref
Alpine skiing	Women's downhill	Lindsey Vonn	United States		
Cross-country skiing	Men's sprint	Nikita Kriukov	Russia		
Cross-country skiing	Women's sprint	Marit Bjørgen	Norway		
Luge	Doubles	Andreas Linger and Wolfgang Linger	Austria		
Short track	Women's 500 metres	Wang Meng	China		
Snowboarding	Men's halfpipe	Shaun White	United States		
Speed skating	Men's 1000 metres	Shani Davis	United States		

== Day 7 – February 18 ==
Alpine skiing

- After weather delays, Germany's Maria Riesch skis to gold in women's combined. Anja Pärson of Sweden manages to repeat her bronze from Turin despite having been in a serious fall the day before.

Biathlon

- Norway takes two golds when Emil Hegle Svendsen and Tora Berger each win the men's individual and women's individual, respectively. However, Norwegian biathlon legend Ole Einar Bjørndalen struggles to make his mark.

Figure skating

- Evan Lysacek of the United States wins men's singles, the first gold for the US since Brian Boitano. Controversy arises as silver medalist Evgeni Plushenko of Russia criticizes the judging system as he performed a more difficult element, the quadruple toe loop, though scored lower because of poorer form. Lysacek never performed a quadruple jump in his long program.

Snowboarding

- Torah Bright won Australia's second medal of the Games in women's halfpipe, and she had a surprise at the end - her parents had travelled in secret to support her at the slope.

Speed skating

- Christine Nesbitt captured Canada's first speedskating gold medal of the Vancouver Games in the women's 1000 metres, outskating her main World Cup rival, Annette Gerritsen of Netherlands by just 0.02 second.

Gold medalists
Sport	Event	Competitor(s)	NOC	Rec	Ref
Alpine skiing	Women's combined	Maria Riesch	Germany		
Biathlon	Women's individual	Tora Berger	Norway		
Biathlon	Men's individual	Emil Hegle Svendsen	Norway		
Figure skating	Men's singles	Evan Lysacek	United States		
Snowboarding	Women's halfpipe	Torah Bright	Australia		
Speed skating	Women's 1000 metres	Christine Nesbitt	Canada		

== Day 8 – February 19 ==
Cross-country skiing

- Norway's Marit Bjørgen wins her third medal (second gold) in Vancouver.

Skeleton

- Despite complaints about possible aero-dynamic elements to her helmet, Amy Williams of Great Britain wins the women's skeleton. She is the first British athlete to win an individual Winter Olympic gold medal in thirty years.

Gold medalists
Sport	Event	Competitor(s)	NOC	Rec	Ref
Alpine skiing	Men's super-G	Aksel Lund Svindal	Norway		
Cross-country skiing	Women's 15 km pursuit	Marit Bjørgen	Norway		
Skeleton	Men's	Jon Montgomery	Canada	TR	
Skeleton	Women's	Amy Williams	Great Britain	TR	

== Day 9 – February 20 ==
Short track

- In the second semifinal of the women's 1500 m, China's Wang Meng, a strong contender for a medal, caused a crash and knocked out United States' Katherine Reutter and South Korea's Cho Ha-Ri who were in qualifying positions. Wang was disqualified due to impeding and Reutter and Cho were allowed to advance to the final resulting in a large 8-woman final.

Ski jumping

- The medal winners in large hill individual repeat from the normal hill, with Switzerland's Simon Ammann winning his fourth individual gold medal in the Olympics, a record.

Speed skating

- Netherlands' Mark Tuitert skated to a surprise gold victory over favored American Shani Davis who took silver in men's 1500 m.

Gold medalists
Sport	Event	Competitor(s)	NOC	Rec	Ref
Alpine skiing	Women's super-G	Andrea Fischbacher	Austria		
Cross-country skiing	Men's 30 km pursuit	Marcus Hellner	Sweden		
Short track	Women's 1500 metres	Zhou Yang	China	OR	
Short track	Men's 1000 metres	Lee Jung-Su	South Korea	OR	
Ski jumping	Large hill individual	Simon Ammann	Switzerland		
Speed skating	Men's 1500 metres	Mark Tuitert	Netherlands	TR	

== Day 10 – February 21 ==
Alpine skiing

- Bode Miller of the United States wins the men's combined earning his first Olympic gold. He was ranked 7th after the downhill event but jumped to gold with the 3rd fastest time in the slalom. Aksel Lund Svindal of Norway led after the downhill event but veered off-course in the slalom.

Biathlon

- Evgeny Ustyugov wins the men's mass start ending Russia's 16-year gold medal drought in this event. He won in 35:35.7 and with no penalties. Despite incurring three penalties, Martin Fourcade of France captures the silver medal 10.5 seconds behind Ustyugov.
- Germany's Magdalena Neuner continues her strong performance in Vancouver earning her third medal, second gold.

Bobsleigh

- Germany's bobsleigh driver André Lange, with Kevin Kuske, won his fourth gold in four career races, taking the two-man competition to become the most successful pilot in Olympic history.

Men's ski cross

- Switzerland's Michael Schmid takes the first gold medal in the inauguration of ski cross.

Ice hockey

- The Canadian men's team are defeated by the Americans 5–3, forcing them into a more difficult path into the final rounds.

Speed skating

- Although she won bronze in Turin, Ireen Wüst of Netherlands claims gold in the 1500 metres against expectations. It was the second at these games where the gold medal favorite in this distance had been defeated by a Dutch, Kristina Groves settled for silver as did Shani Davis who lost to Mark Tuitert on the men's side.

Gold medalists
Sport	Event	Competitor(s)	NOC	Rec	Ref
Alpine skiing	Men's combined	Bode Miller	United States		
Biathlon	Men's mass start	Evgeny Ustyugov	Russia		
Biathlon	Women's mass start	Magdalena Neuner	Germany		
Bobsleigh	Two-man	André Lange and Kevin Kuske	Germany		
Freestyle	Men's ski cross	Michael Schmid	Switzerland		
Speed skating	Women's 1500 metres	Ireen Wüst	Netherlands	TR	

== Day 11 – February 22 ==
Figure skating

- Canadians Tessa Virtue and Scott Moir win the first ever North American Ice dancing gold medal; they are joined on the stand by their best friends and training partners Americans Meryl Davis and Charlie White. The Russians Oksana Domnina and Maxim Shabalin narrowly win bronze amidst criticism of their costumes and Aborigine-inspired routine over Torino silver medalists Tanith Belbin and Ben Agosto.

Gold medalists
Sport	Event	Competitor(s)	NOC	Rec	Ref
Cross-country	Men's team sprint	Øystein Pettersen and Petter Northug	Norway		
Cross-country	Women's team sprint	Evi Sachenbacher-Stehle and Claudia Nystad	Germany		
Figure skating	Ice dancing	Tessa Virtue and Scott Moir	Canada		
Ski jumping	Large hill team	Gregor Schlierenzauer, Thomas Morgenstern, Wolfgang Loitzl and Andreas Kofler	Austria		

== Day 12 – February 23 ==
Speed skating

- Lee Seung-hoon of South Korea skated to an Olympic record of 12:58.55 in the men's 10000 metres. In a bizarre twist, Sven Kramer of the Netherlands who beat Lee by over four seconds was disqualified when he failed to make a lane change, losing both the record and the gold medal. Lee is the first Asian to medal in an Olympic 10000 m speed skating event.

Women's ski cross

- Canadian Ashleigh McIvor wins the gold medal in the first women's ski cross event at the Winter Olympics.

Nordic combined

- Austria defends their Olympic gold in the team large hill/4 × 5 km while United States gets their first medal in the event.

Gold medalists
Sport	Event	Competitor(s)	NOC	Rec	Ref
Alpine skiing	Men's giant slalom	Carlo Janka	Switzerland		
Biathlon	Women's relay	Svetlana Sleptsova, Anna Bogaliy-Titovets, Olga Medvedtseva, Olga Zaitseva	Russia		
Freestyle	Women's ski cross	Ashleigh McIvor	Canada		
Nordic combined	Team large hill/4 x 5 km	Bernhard Gruber, David Kreiner, Felix Gottwald, Mario Stecher	Austria		
Speed skating	Men's 10000 metres	Lee Seung-hoon	South Korea	OR	

== Day 13 – February 24 ==
Alpine skiing

- The women's giant slalom competition was originally scheduled for February 24, but the event was halted after the first run due to low clouds and poor visibility and rescheduled to 09:30 PST on February 25.

Short track

- In the women's 3000 m relay in short track speed skating South Korea was disqualified after finishing first in the final, giving China the gold medal. China set a world record in the event. Coincidentally, the judge who disqualified South Korea, Australian judge James Hewish, was also the same judge who disqualified South Korea's Kim Dong-Sung in the men's 1500 m at the 2002 Winter Olympics.

Speed skating

- Czech Republic's Martina Sáblíková earns her third medal and second gold by winning the women's 5000 metres. Skating in the last pairing, she started her race with the fastest 200 m split, never relinquished her lead, and crossed the finish line just 0.48 seconds ahead of Germany's Stephanie Beckert. Sáblíková was so tired at the end of the race that she crumpled to the ice after slowly gliding to a standstill. She then had her coach take off her skates and started her victory lap in her socks.

Ice hockey

- Canada defeats Russia in a 7–3 win in men's ice hockey and advances to the semi-finals against Slovakia.

Gold medalists
Sport	Event	Competitor(s)	NOC	Rec	Ref
Bobsleigh	Two-woman	Kaillie Humphries, Heather Moyse	Canada		
Cross-country	Men's 4 x 10 km relay	Daniel Richardsson, Johan Olsson, Anders Södergren, Marcus Hellner	Sweden		
Freestyle	Women's aerials	Lydia Lassila	Australia		
Short track	Women's 3000 m relay	Sun Linlin, Wang Meng, Zhang Hui, Zhou Yang	China	WR	
Speed skating	Women's 5000 metres	Martina Sáblíková	Czech Republic		

== Day 14 – February 25 ==
Ice hockey

- Canada defeats the United States 2–0 in the gold medal game in women's ice hockey.

Figure skating

- South Korea's Kim Yuna wins the gold medal in the ladies' singles, setting a new world record of 150.06 points for the free skate and for the combined total of 228.56 points. The United States fails to win a medal in this discipline for the first time since Innsbruck in 1964.

Nordic combined

- Bill Demong win gold in the 10 km individual large hill event, becoming the first American to win gold in any Nordic skiing event (cross-country skiing, ski jumping, or Nordic combined) at a Winter Olympics.

Gold medalists
Sport	Event	Competitor(s)	NOC	Rec	Ref
Alpine skiing	Women's giant slalom	Viktoria Rebensburg	Germany		
Cross-country	Women's 4 x 5 km relay	Vibeke Skofterud, Therese Johaug, Kristin Størmer Steira, Marit Bjørgen	Norway		
Figure skating	Ladies' singles	Kim Yuna	South Korea	WR	
Freestyle	Men's aerials	Alexei Grishin	Belarus		
Ice hockey	Women's	Canada women's national ice hockey team (roster)	Canada		
Nordic combined	Individual large hill/10 km	Bill Demong	United States		

== Day 15 – February 26 ==
Biathlon

- Norway's Ole Einar Bjørndalen anchors the Norwegian team to gold in the men's relay. With 11 medals, he is now the second most successful Winter Olympic athlete in history. While Norway won gold by over 38 seconds, only 0.2 seconds separated silver won by Austria from bronze won by Russia.

Curling

- Sweden defeats Canada 7–6 in the gold medal game in women's curling.

Short track

- China's Wang Meng wins the gold in the women's 1000 metres which gives China a gold medal sweep of the women's events. It was Wang's third gold medal of the Games. Katherine Reutter wins the silver giving the United States its first medal in an Olympic women's event since the 1994 Winter Olympics in Lillehammer.
- Minor controversy ensues in the final turn of the men's 500 metres when Canada's François-Louis Tremblay and South Korea's Sung Si-Bak fell while Charles Hamelin and Apolo Ohno finished first and second. The Canadian judge disqualified Ohno for causing Tremblay to crash and ruled that Sung had slipped on his own and not by Hamelin's actions.

Gold medalists
Sport	Event	Competitor(s)	NOC	Rec	Ref
Alpine skiing	Women's slalom	Maria Riesch	Germany		
Biathlon	Men's relay	Halvard Hanevold, Tarjei Bø, Emil Hegle Svendsen, Ole Einar Bjørndalen	Norway		
Curling	Women's	Kajsa Bergström, Anna Le Moine, Cathrine Lindahl, Eva Lund, Anette Norberg	Sweden		
Short track	Men's 500 metres	Charles Hamelin	Canada		
Short track	Women's 1000 metres	Wang Meng	China		
Short track	Men's 5000 m relay	Guillaume Bastille, Charles Hamelin, François Hamelin, Olivier Jean, François-Louis Tremblay	Canada		
Snowboarding	Women's parallel giant slalom	Nicolien Sauerbreij	Netherlands		

== Day 16 – February 27 ==
Curling

- Canada defeats Norway 6–3 in the gold medal game in men's curling.

Cross-country skiing

- Poland's Justyna Kowalczyk becomes the first woman from her country ever to win a Winter Olympic gold medal in the 30 km classical cross-country event.

Gold medalists
Sport	Event	Competitor(s)	NOC	Rec	Ref
Alpine skiing	Men's slalom	Giuliano Razzoli	Italy		
Bobsleigh	Four-man	Steve Holcomb, Steve Mesler, Curtis Tomasevicz, Justin Olsen	United States		
Cross-country skiing	Women's 30 km classical	Justyna Kowalczyk	Poland		
Curling	Men's	Kevin Martin, John Morris, Marc Kennedy, Ben Hebert, Adam Enright	Canada		
Snowboarding	Men's parallel giant slalom	Jasey-Jay Anderson	Canada		
Speed skating	Men's team pursuit	Mathieu Giroux, Lucas Makowsky, Denny Morrison	Canada		
Speed skating	Women's team pursuit	Daniela Anschütz-Thoms, Stephanie Beckert, Anni Friesinger-Postma, Katrin Mattscherodt	Germany		

== Day 17 – February 28 ==
Cross-country skiing

- Norway's Petter Northug narrowly beats Germany's Axel Teichmann at the finish line by only 0.3 seconds to win the gold medal in the men's 50 km classical.

Ice hockey

- Canada defeats the United States in overtime, 3–2, in the gold medal game in men's ice hockey. The United States goalie Ryan Miller is named MVP of the tournament.

Medal count

- Canada ends the Olympics with 14 gold medals, the most for any country (host or otherwise) in any Winter Olympics. The U.S. ends with 37 total medals, also the most for any country (host or otherwise) in any Winter Olympics.

Closing ceremony

- The closing ceremony took place at 5:30 Pacific Time (01:30 1 March UTC) at BC Place Stadium. In the Antwerp Ceremony, the Olympic flag was given to Mayor Anatoly Pakhomov of Sochi, Russia, host of the 2014 Winter Olympics.
- Michael Bublé, Neil Young, Avril Lavigne, K-os, Nickelback, Simple Plan, Hedley, Marie-Mai and Alanis Morissette performed. William Shatner, Catherine O'Hara and Michael J. Fox also appeared.

Gold medalists
Sport	Event	Competitor(s)	NOC	Rec	Ref
Cross-country skiing	Men's 50 km classical	Petter Northug	Norway		
Ice hockey	Men's	Canada men's national ice hockey team (roster)	Canada		

== See also ==
- Chronological summary of the 2006 Winter Olympics
- Chronological summary of the 2008 Summer Olympics
- Chronological summary of the 2010 Summer Youth Olympics
