= Svetlana Vinogradova =

Russian snowboarder

Personal information
- Nationality: Russian
- Born: 21 August 1987 (age 37); Novosibirsk, Russia

Sport
- Sport: Snowboarding

Svetlana Vinogradova (born 21 August 1987) is a Russian snowboarder. She competed in the women's halfpipe event at the 2006 Winter Olympics.
