= Mariya Prusakova (snowboarder) =

Russian snowboarder

Personal information
- Nationality: Russian
- Born: 25 December 1989 (age 36) Moscow, Russia

Sport
- Sport: Snowboarding

Mariya "Masha" Prusakova (born 25 December 1989) is a Russian former snowboarder and pro-cryptocurrency publicist. She competed in the women's halfpipe event at the 2006 Winter Olympics. She is also known for her relationship with child sex trafficker Jeffrey Epstein, for whom she recruited victims.

== Biography ==
Prusakova was born in December 1989 in Moscow. She was associated with the Moscow Army Sports Club (SKA Moskva). She won gold in the halfpipe events at the 2006 and 2007 snowboarding national championships in Russia. She represented Russia at the 2006 Winter Olympics in the women's halfpipe event, placing thirty-second. At 16 years old, she was one of the youngest Olympians at the 2006 Winter Games.

Prusakova met American financier and child sex offender Jeffrey Epstein in 2011. She recruited women into Epstein's trafficking network, calling herself the "Paris based Ghislaine Maxwell" in a 2013 email to Epstein. Epstein financed some of Prusakova's Master of Law degree from the University of California, Berkeley. In 2018, she co-founded Crypto PR Lab, a pro-cryptocurrency public relations firm.
