= Clara Villoslada =

Spanish snowboarder

Personal information
- Nationality: Spanish
- Born: 28 August 1980 (age 44); Buenos Aires, Argentina

Sport
- Sport: Snowboarding

Clara Villoslada (born 28 August 1980) is a Spanish snowboarder. She competed in the women's halfpipe event at the 2006 Winter Olympics.
