= Damon Hayler =

Australian snowboarder

Damon Hayler (born 6 July 1976) is an Australian snowboarder, competing in the snowboard cross. He competed in the 2006 Winter Olympics and was rated as a medal chance.

He placed only 28th out of 36 competitors in the first qualifying run, but improved to 12th in the second. This was enough to make the 1/8 final, where he finished first. He came second in his quarterfinal, but was then disqualified in the semifinals. He then came third in the small final and was sevenths out of 36 competitors overall.
