= Velišovští z Velišova =

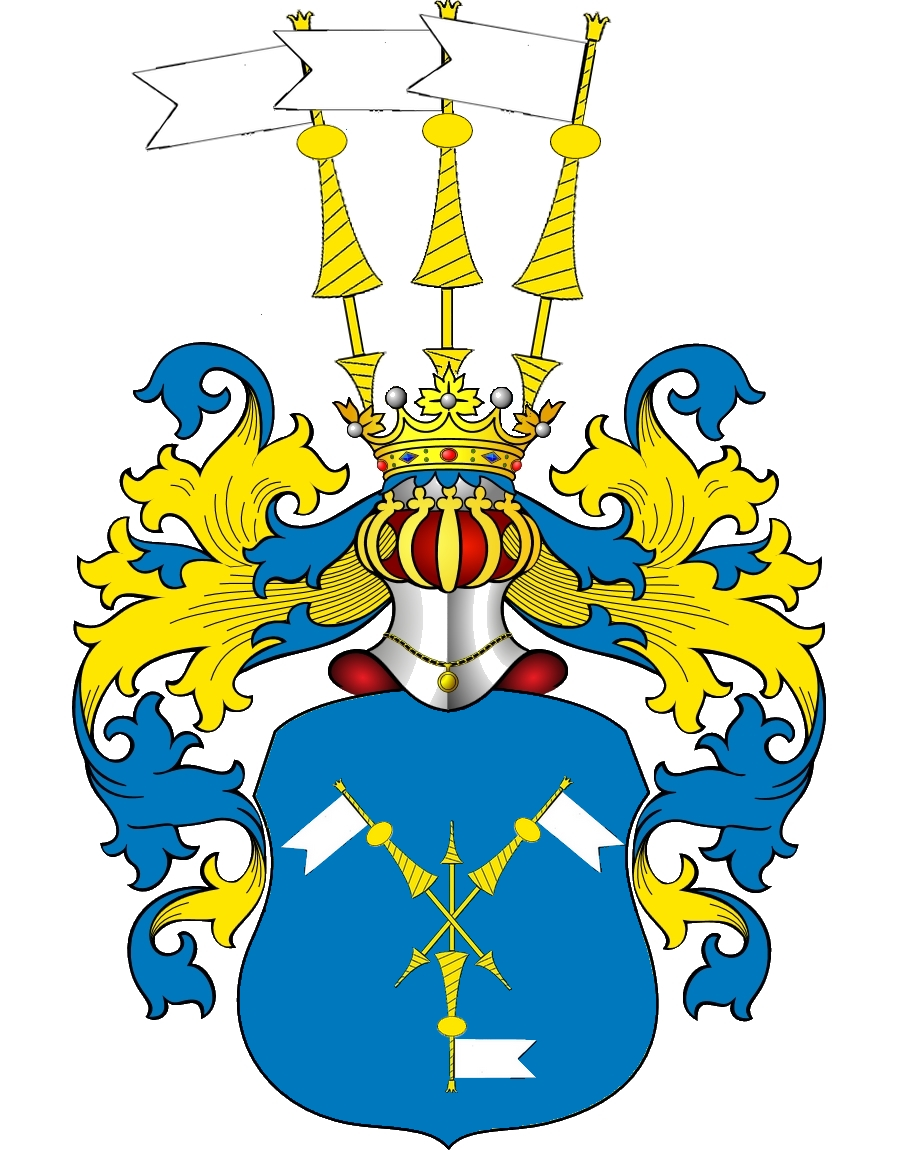
- Parent house: Markwartinger, Waldstein and Wartenberg?
- Country: Bohemia, Moravia
- Founded: c. 1400
- Titles: Nobles; Lords; Knights of Moravia
- Deposition: c. 1550

Velišovští z Velišova is a Czech noble family. The family counted politicians, military and ecclesiastical among its numbers. It is related to many other noble families, including Markwartinger, Přemyslid, Waldstein and Wartenberg. All nobles from Wartenberg were laid, except the branch Welischensi, since the race was Weseli the direct lineage of Wartenberg.

During the Counter-Reformation, many aristocratic families moved from the cities to the suburbs, or migrated to other states. After the retreat from the Ottoman Empire, and the various political changes, allowed the king to weaken the power of the old feudal families. The culmination of these changes was the Thirty Years' War. Later on May 10, 1627, Ferdinand II, adopted a new constitution for the Kingdom of Bohemia.

== Coat of arms ==
In 1529 is registered by the King Ferdinand I of Habsburg, the family crest and is granted the noble predicate "z Velišova".
It is composed as follows: Blue shield - in the shield are three small yellow finials with weathervanes - two of finials are crossed up and third is through them vertically overturned. On the shield is tournament helmet - on helmet are hanging yellow and blue blankets. Above this all are three small finials with weathervanes.

== Veliš village ==
The first mention of Veliš dates back to 1143 during the reign of Vladislav II of Bohemia, when the bishop of Prague, Jan I, bought by Benes son of Marco two plots in Velis and donated them to the Strahov Monastery, where he had previously abbot. The country's history is closely connected with the history of the castle. The castle ruins are on Veliš hill above the village Velis. During its existence many were the owners: John of Luxembourg, the family of Vartemberks, Albrecht von Wallenstein, George of Bohemia and the family of Schlick. Since 1500 there have been over a hundred years kept the Basel Compacts. In the late 16th century, the owner William Trcka Lipa has performed the work to complete the castle. The castle besieged by the Swedes during the Thirty Years' War but without success. By imperial order, the castle was demolished in 1658 to avoid falling into the hands of the enemy troops, but previously had now fallen into disuse. Although they were already considerably damaged the castle ruins, the greatest destruction occurred in the 19th century due to a basalt quarry, which was active in the early years of the 17th century.

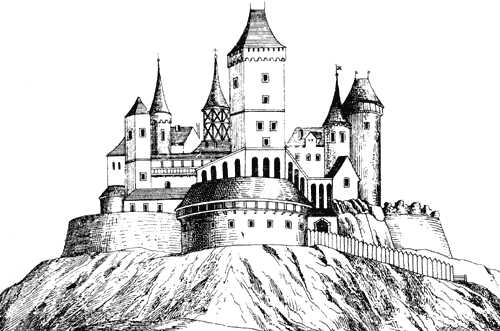
Veliš Castle in 1650

To get an idea the castle of Velis, we must rely on the images and paintings of the era. According to one of the drawings the main tower of the castle was covered with a gable roof with battlements, and was located about half of the castle. They were also two buildings completed two smaller towers, one of which was attached to the eastern chapel. To the north was the construction of a tunnel and various loopholes. The access road to the western gate was protected by palisades. Only small remnants of the walls of the ramparts, towers and palaces remain of the castle, which is protected as a cultural monument of the Czech Republic.

== History ==
- 1180 Prince Frederick donated the village Velké Všelisy to the bishop of Prague Velišovi.
- 1179 - 6.2. 1182 Valentin Velišovi, Bishop of Prague of the order of the Premonstratensians

"It came from Thuringia (Germany). He was a monk in the Strahov monastery, where he was renowned for his piety. For this reason, the Princess Elizabeth chose him as pastor of the court. After the death of Bishop Frederick was selected by the jury as the new Bishop of Prague, with the support of the Duchess and her husband Frederick. He was appointed bishop probably in Mainz, the Archbishop of Mainz Christian von Buch. During his short pontificate occurred Lateran Council III. He died in 1182."

- 1187 Veliš castellano Pragensi.
- 1199 Busse filius Velissonis.
- 06/18/1305, Václav II cedes land to Vrbice u Podebrad to Canon Janu Velišovu.
- 02/02/1348 Lord Janu Velišovi of Prague (lat. Johanni Welisch) receives from Charles IV "Karolus, rex Romanorum et Bohemiae" a sum of money.
- 1389 Budiš from Seloutky gives three fields in Rakuskách (Rakůvka, Moravia) to Janovi Velišovi and brothers.
- 10/11/1529 George, Paul, Peter and John Velišovský of Velišov grant to Jan (John) Vrbcansky, their uncle, to use the coat of arms of Velišovských Velišova. Its logo is registered in 1539 in the archives of České Brod (S.678).
- 1539 Jan Velišovský is official town of Klučov (Central Bohemia).
- 1540 Paul Velišovský of Velišova was admitted to the cavalry of Moravia.
- 1541 Jan Velišovský of Velišova receives a knighthood.
- 1544 Paul Velišova, representative of the Holomúce (Moravia) to the Czech parliament.

== Bibliography ==
Czech Language

- A.Boček, Codex diplomaticus et epistolaris Moraviae I (396-1199), Olomouc, 1836
- Antonín Kotík, Naše Příjmení: studie ku poznání Příjmení českoslovanských, 1897
- A. Profouse, Místní jména v Čechách, jejich vznik, původní význam a změny, IV, 1954
- A. Sedláček, Českomoravská heraldika - část zvláštní, 1925
- It. Zíbrt, bibliographies české historie, 1901
- F. Faktor, Popis okresního hejtmanství Prostějovského, Prague, 1898
- M. Moroškin, Onomasticon slavicum seu collectio personalium slavicorum nominum, 1867
- M. Mysliveček, Velký erbovník II, Fraus Plzeň 2006
- M. Kolář, A. Sedláček, Českomoravská heraldika - část všeobecná, 1902
- J. Váňa, Hynek from Dube, the Courtier of Wenceslas the Second, Prague, 2011
- J. Brňovják, Nobilitace Světlé písemných Pramenů. Nobilitas in modern historia , 2009
- VK z Dobré Vody, heraldika, Praha Karlín 1900

German language

- Archiv für Geschichte, Statistik, Literatur und Kunst, Volume 18, Vienna, 1827
- K.Dobrá voda, Der Adel von Böhmen, Mähren und Schlesien - Standeserhebungen, Prädikate, Beförderungen, Inkolate, Wappen und Wappenverbesserungen des gesamten Adels Böhmischen der Krone, Prague 1904

Archives in Latin - Czech

- Archivum Coronae Kingdoms Bohemiae III, Prague
- Archiv Pražského hradu, Fund: Archiv Metropolitní kapituly u sv. Vitus, Prague
