= Chikako Fushimi =

Japanese snowboarder (born 1974)

Fushimi Chikako
Personal information
- Full name: Fushimi Chikako
- Born: June 21, 1974 (age 52) Osaka

Sport
- Country: Japan
- Sport: Snowboarding

Chikako Fushimi (伏見 知何子, Fushimi Chikako) (born 21 June 1974) is a Japanese snowboarder. Born in Osaka Prefecture, her career-high has so far been a 3rd-place finish in the 2005 Nokia Snowboard FIS World Cup held in Canada.

She competed in the Women's Halfpipe in the 2006 Winter Olympics in Turin, Italy. Fushimi qualified for the competition's final, which was held on 13 February, but only finished 12th with a score of 15.6.
