= Jonatan Johansson (snowboarder) =

Swedish snowboarder (1980–2006)

Jonatan Johansson (7 March 1980, Sollentuna, Stockholm County – 12 March 2006, Lake Placid, New York) was a Swedish Olympic snowboarder. He died following a failed jump landing during training for the International Ski Federation World Cup competition.

== Biography ==
In 2000, Johansson began competing at the World Cup level and was ranked 45th in the world. In 2005, he was the Swedish champion and won first prize in the Finnish National Championship. He was twelfth in the final rankings for Snowboard Cross at the 2006 Winter Olympics in Turin, Italy.

He died in a snowboarding accident at Whiteface Mountain in Lake Placid, New York, five days after his 26th birthday. It was the last run he had planned for the day. He lost his balance in midair and fell, breaking his femur and ribs, and suffering a fatal ripped aorta and punctured lung and heart.
