= Jason Smith (snowboarder) =

American snowboarder (born 1982)

Jason R. Smith (born January 11, 1982, in Aspen, Colorado) a student of Fort Lewis College, is an American snowboarder, primarily successful in the event Snowboard Cross, finishing Sixth place in the 2006 Torino Winter Games.

He was the roommate of Seth Wescott, eventual Gold Medalist in Snowboard X (SBX or Snowboard Cross).

He is the younger brother of Christy Smith, the first Deaf contestant on Survivor: The Amazon.
