= Radoslav Židek =

Slovak snowboarder (born 1981)

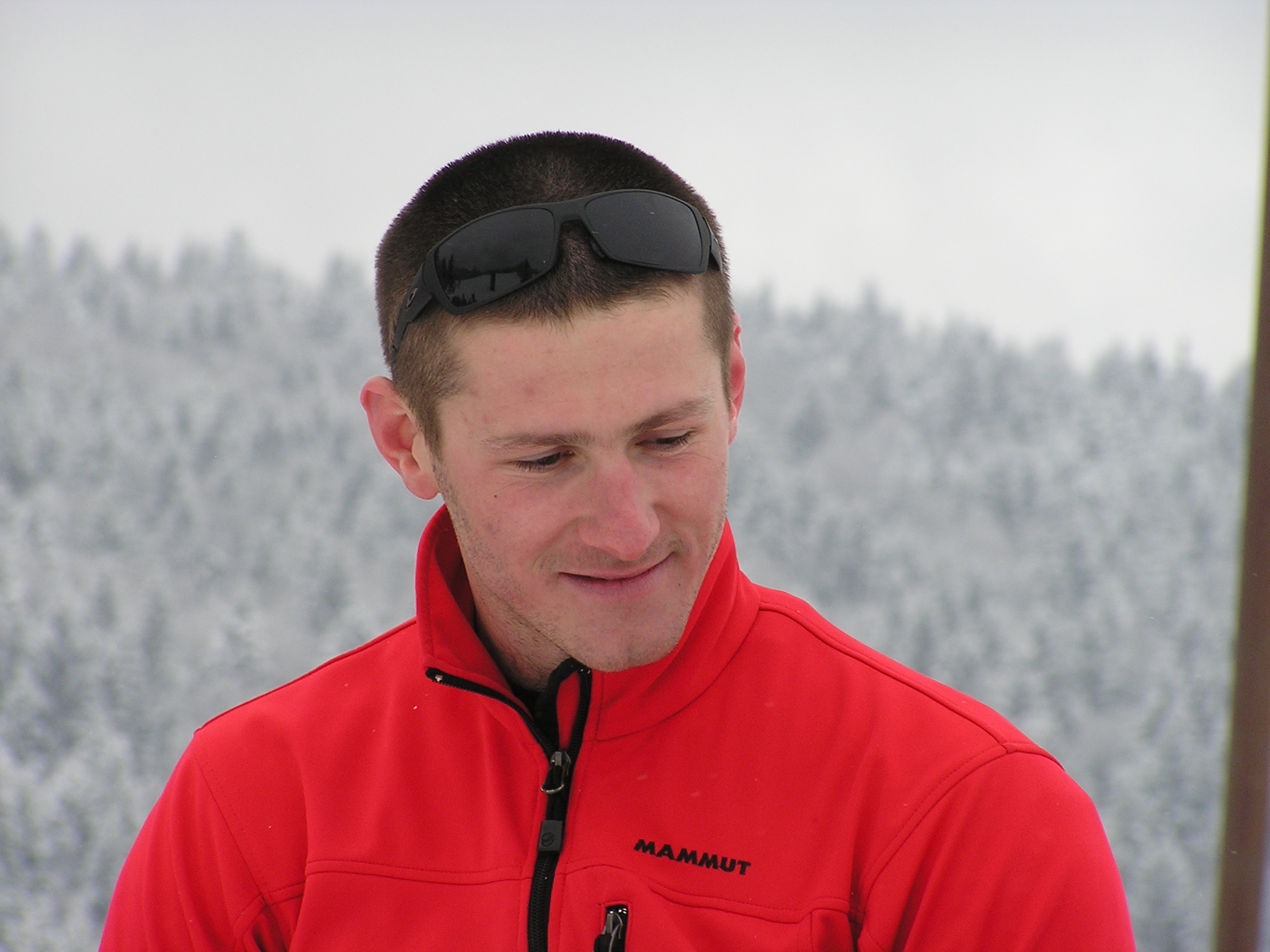

Personal information
- Born: 15 October 1981 (age 44) Žilina, Czechoslovakia
Medal record
Radoslav Židek
Medal record
Men's Snowboarding
Silver medal – second place	2006 Turin	Snowboard Cross

Radoslav Židek (born 15 October 1981) is a Slovak snowboarder. He became the first Slovak to win a Winter Olympic Games medal, having achieved silver in Snowboard Cross at the 2006 Winter Olympics.

== Career ==
Židek competed in the Canadian city of Whistler at the FIS Snowboarding World Championships 2005, where he finished in 11th place.

Židek took part in the 2006 Winter Olympics in Turin. In the Snowboard Cross final he led for most of the race, but eventually finished second behind American Seth Wescott. By doing so, he won an Olympic silver medal: the first time Slovakia had won a medal at the Winter Olympic games since their 1993 independence. In March 2006, Židek finished 15th in the last of the nine snowboard cross events of the 2005–06 FIS Snowboard World Cup. He finished the season in 16th place overall.

Židek won the Sportsperson of the Year award for Slovakia in 2006, finishing ahead of canoeist Jana Dukátová and ice hockey player Marián Hossa. It also marked the first time Židek had placed within the top 10.

In January 2007, Židek participated in the FIS Snowboarding World Championships. Despite having the second-fastest time in the qualifying round, he was less successful later in the competition and finished in 17th place, failing to improve his position from the championships two years prior.

Židek failed to finish in the top three during the 2007–08 FIS Snowboard World Cup, with his best results coming in Sungwoo, Korea (fifth in February 2008) and sixth place at Lake Placid in the United States a month later. In September 2008, Židek had surgery after sustaining an injury on the anterior cruciate ligament in his right knee, but required a further operation in June 2009 for the same complaint.

== Personal life ==
Židek was piloting a plane which crashed and caught fire in 2022, in northern Slovakia. He sustained burns to 30% of his body in the incident.
