= Jordi Font =

Spanish snowboarder

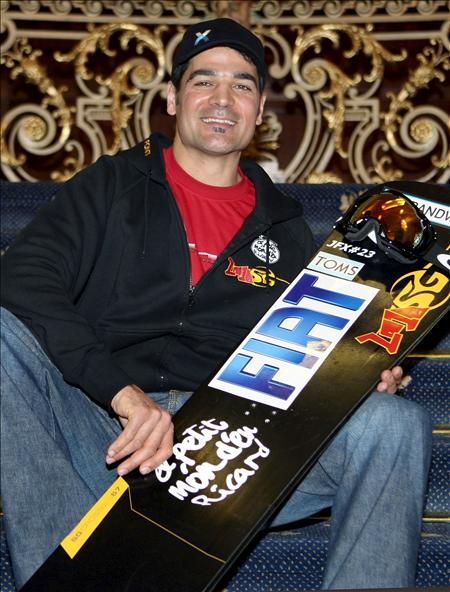

Personal information
- Nationality: Spanish
- Born: May 1, 1975 (age 51)

Sport
- Sport: Snowboarding

Jordi Font (born 1 May 1975 in Barcelona) is a Spanish snowboarder. He placed fourth in the men's snowboard cross event at the 2006 Winter Olympics; he also competed in the same event at the 2010 Winter Olympics but did not finish the qualification round.
