= Ibón Idigoras =

Spanish snowboarder

Personal information
- Nationality: Spanish
- Born: 8 November 1979 (age 45); Zarautz, Spain

Sport
- Sport: Snowboarding

Ibón Idigoras (born 8 November 1979) is a Spanish snowboarder. He competed in the men's snowboard cross event at the 2006 Winter Olympics.
