= Michal Novotný =

Czech snowboarder

Personal information
- Nationality: Czech
- Born: July 1, 1981 (age 43)

Sport
- Sport: Snowboarding

Michal Novotný (born 1 July 1981 in Prague) is a Czech snowboarder. He competed in the men's snowboard cross event at the 2006 Winter Olympics, placing thirteenth, and the 2010 Winter Olympics, placing sixteenth.
