= Paul-Henri de Le Rue =

French snowboarder (born 1984)

Medal record

Representing France

Men's Snowboarding

Olympic Games
| Bronze medal – third place | 2006 Turin | Snowboard Cross |

Paul-Henri de Le Rue (born 17 April 1984) is a French snowboarder who competed at the 2006 Winter Olympics in Turin, Italy. de le Rue won bronze in the men's snowboard cross event and is currently competing at the Freeride World Tour.

He is a brother of snowboarders Xavier de Le Rue and Victor de Le Rue.
