= 1997 3 Nations Cup =

Tournament details
- Host countries: Canada; United States
- Venues: 6 (in 6 host cities)
- Dates: 13–20 December
- Teams: 3

Final positions
- Champions: United States (1st title)
- Runners-up: Canada
- Third place: Finland

Tournament statistics
- Games played: 7
- Goals scored: 52 (7.43 per game)
- Scoring leader: (Canada) Hayley Wickenheiser (8 points)

The 1997 3 Nations Cup was a women's ice hockey tournament held various locations of the Northeastern United States and Canada from December 13–20, 1997. It was the second edition of the 3 Nations Cup.

== Results ==
=== Preliminary round ===
Pos	Team	Pld	W	L	T	GF	GA	GD	Pts	Qualification
1	Canada (H)	4	4	0	0	22	12	+10	8	Advance to Gold medal game
2	United States (H)	4	1	2	1	15	14	+1	3	Advance to Gold medal game
3	Finland	4	0	3	1	12	23	−11	1	

Source: Hockey Canada
(H) Hosts

All times are local (UTC−5).

13 December	United States	3–3	Finland	Herb Brooks Arena, Lake Placid

14 December	United States	2–3 (0–0, 1–2, 1–1)	Canada	Herb Brooks Arena, Lake Placid

Game reference

Sara DeCosta
Goalies
Lesley Reddon

	0–1	22:30 – Wickenheiser (Brisson, Smith)
Granato (Mounsey) – 28:15	1–1
	1–2	30:18 – Wilson (Wickenheiser)
	1–3	54:01 – Drolet
Whyte (Granato, Mounsey) (PP) – 57:49	2–3

10 min
Penalties
14 min
34
Shots
35

15 December	Finland	3–6 (1–1, 0–1, 2–4)	Canada	Nepean Sportsplex, Ottawa

Game reference

Liisa-Maria Sneck
Goalies
Manon Rhéaume

Selin (Fisk, Hänninen) – 11:07	1–0
	1–1	13:55 – Sunohara (Nystrom, Brisson)
	1–2	23:19 – Goyette (McCormack)
	1–3	43:58 – Botterill (Kellar, Heany)
	1–4	44:55 – Nystrom (Smith)
Vaarakallio (Nieminen, Hänninen) – 49:15	2–4
Reima (Selin, Haanpää) – 49:55	3–4
	3–5	54:25 – Wilson (Drolet, Goyette)
	3–6	58:36 – Drolet

41
Shots
22

16 December	United States	6–3	Finland	Weibel Avenue Ice Rink, Saratoga Springs

17 December	United States	4–5 (2–1, 2–2, 0–2)	Canada	Gutterson Fieldhouse, Burlington

Game reference

Erin Whitten
Goalies
Manon Rhéaume

	0–1	04:49 – Hefford (Goyette, Wickenheiser) (PP)
Ulion (Bailey, Bye) – 09:54	1–1
Baker (King) – 14:42	2–1
King (Looney, Baker) (PP) – 22:23	3–1
Granato (Bye) – 23:03	4–1
	4–2	23:19 – Brisson (Smith)
	4–3	28:00 – Wilson (Drolet, Schuler)
	4–4	52:42 – Goyette (Wickenheiser, Heany) (PP)
	4–5	57:55 – Hefford (Wickenheiser)

10 min
Penalties
18 min
24
Shots
32

18 December	Finland	3–8 (2–4, 0–2, 1–2)	Canada	Quinte Sports Centre, Belleville

Game reference

Tuula Puputti
Liisa-Maria Sneck
Goalies
Lesley Reddon

	0–1	03:17 – Wickenheiser (Hefford)
Fisk (Hänninen, Nieminen) – 05:34	1–1
	1–2	10:14 – Drolet (Nystrom, Goyette)
	1–3	13:51 – Goyette (Wilson, Kellar)
	1–4	18:24 – Wickenheiser (Brisson, McCormack)
Vaarakallio – 19:29	2–4
	2–5	31:56 – Wilson (Goyette, Drolet) (PP)
	2–6	33:34 – Sunohara (Campbell, Dupuis)
	2–7	42:10 – Hefford (Wickenheiser, Kellar)
	2–8	42:43 – McCormack (Wilson, Drolet)
Hänninen (Ikonen) – 49:13	3–8

6 min
Penalties
8 min
25
Shots
37

=== Gold medal game ===
20 December	United States	3–0 (0–0, 3–0, 0–0)	Canada	Herb Brooks Arena, Lake Placid

Game reference

Sara DeCosta
Goalies
Lesley Reddon

Ulion (Whyte, O'Leary) (PP) – 24:06	1–0
Ulion (Movsessian) – 34:29	2–0
Mleczko (Dunn, Looney) – 38:17	3–0

14 min
Penalties
14 min
27
Shots
23

== Statistics ==
=== Final standings ===
Gold medal	United States
Silver medal	Canada
Bronze medal	Finland

=== Scoring leaders ===
Only the top eight skaters, sorted by points, then goals, are included in this list.

Player	GP	G	A	Pts
(Canada) Hayley Wickenheiser	5	3	5	8
(Canada) Stacy Wilson	5	4	3	7
(Canada) Nancy Drolet	5	3	4	7
(Canada) Danielle Goyette	5	3	4	7
(United States) Katie King	5	3	2	5
(United States) Laurie Baker	5	2	3	5
(United States) Karyn Bye	5	1	4	5
(Finland) Kirsi Hanninen	4	1	4	5
