= 1996 3 Nations Cup =

Tournament details
- Host countries: Canada; United States
- Venues: 6 (in 5 host cities)
- Dates: 20–27 October
- Teams: 3

Final positions
- Champions: Canada (1st title)
- Runners-up: United States
- Third place: Finland

Tournament statistics
- Games played: 7
- Goals scored: 31 (4.43 per game)
- Scoring leader: (United States) Cammi Granato (6 points)

The 1996 3 Nations Cup was a women's ice hockey tournament held various locations of Ontario and Canton, New York, from October 20–27, 1996. It was the first edition of the 3 Nations Cup.

== Results ==
=== Preliminary round ===
Pos	Team	Pld	W	L	T	GF	GA	GD	Pts	Qualification
1	Canada (H)	4	3	1	0	12	7	+5	6	Advance to Gold medal game
2	United States (H)	4	3	1	0	12	9	+3	6	Advance to Gold medal game
3	Finland	4	0	4	0	7	14	−7	0	

Source: WHockey.com
(H) Hosts

20 October; 19:00 EDT	Canada	4–1 (0–0, 2–0, 2–1)	Finland	Jim Durrell Arena, Ottawa

Lesley Reddon
Goalies
Liisa-Maria Sneck

Smith	1–0
James	2–0
Chartrand – 47:48	3–0
	3–1	51:00 – Fisk
Unknown	4–1

21 October; 19:00 EDT	United States	3–4	Canada	Cornwall Civic Complex, Cornwall

Erin Whitten
Goalies
Manon Rhéaume
Danielle Dube

	0-1	Drolet
O'Sullivan - 21:27	1–1
Granato	2–1
	2–2	18:30 - Nystrom
	2–3	55:45 – Wickenheiser
	2–4	56:19 – Drolet
Granato	3–4

32
Shots
22

22 October; 19:30 EDT	Finland	1–3 (1–1, 0–1, 0–1)	United States	Appleton Arena, Canton

Tuula Puputti
Goalies
Erin Whitten

Vaarakallio	1–0
	1–1	Ulion
	1–2	26:20 – Granato
	1–3	Mleczko

12
Shots
37

23 October; 19:00 EDT	Canada	3–1 (1–1, 1–0, 1–0)	Finland	Cataraqui Arena, Kingston; Attendance: 1,000

Manon Rhéaume
Goalies
Tuula Puputti

Dupuis (James) – 01:26	1–0
	1–1	Krooks
Benoit (James) (PP) – 31:54	2–1
Deschamps (Campbell) – 57:29	3–1

29
Shots
23

24 October; 19:00 EDT	United States	2–1 OT (0–1, 1–0, 0–0) (OT 1–0)	Canada	Smiths Falls Memorial Centre, Smiths Falls; Attendance: 1,650

Erin Whitten
Goalies
Danielle Dube
Lesley Reddon

	0–1	16:30 – Saint-Louis (Deschamps)
Looney – 35:55	1–1
Looney – 60:15	2–1

25 October; 18:00 EDT	Finland	3–4 (1–1, 2–2, 0–1)	United States	Jim Durrell Arena, Ottawa; Attendance: 250 (approx.)

Liisa-Maria Sneck
Goalies
Sarah Tueting

Ihalainen – 11:46	1–0
	1–1	Kilbourne
Fisk – 23:44	2–1
	2–2	27:20 – Granato
	2–3	30:40 – Bye
Fisk – 35:03	3–3
	3–4	56:01 – Granato

=== Gold medal game ===
27 October; 15:00 EST	Canada	1–0 (0–0, 0–0, 1–0)	United States	Ottawa Civic Centre, Ottawa; Attendance: 4,200

Danielle Dube	Goalies	Erin Whitten
Deschamps (Drolet, Saint-Louis) – 51:30 / 1–0
20	Shots	27

== Statistics ==
=== Final standings ===
Gold medal	Canada
Silver medal	United States
Bronze medal	Finland

=== Scoring leaders ===
Only the top ten skaters, sorted by points, then goals, are included in this list.

Player	GP	G	A	Pts	PIM	Pos
(United States) Cammi Granato	5	5	1	6	2	F
(United States) Steph O'Sullivan	5	1	4	5	4	F
(Finland) Sari Fisk	4	3	1	4	2	F
(Canada) Nancy Deschamps	5	2	2	4	6	F
(Canada) Nancy Drolet	4	2	1	3	0	F
(United States) Shelley Looney	5	2	1	3	2	F
(Canada) Angela James	5	1	2	3	2	F
(Canada) Amanda Benoit	5	1	2	3	8	F
(Finland) Pirjo Nieminen	4	0	3	3	6	D
(United States) Sandra Whyte	5	0	3	3	0	F

Source: Hockey Canada

==== Goaltending leaders ====
The four goaltenders, based on goals against average, who played at least 40% of their team's minutes, are included in this list.

Player	TOI	GA	GAA	SA	SV%	SO
(Canada) Danielle Dube	130:00	3	1.38	—	—	1
(United States) Erin Whitten	240:00	7	1.75	78	.910	0
(Finland) Tuula Puputti	120:00	6	3.00	—	—	0
(Finland) Liisa-Maria Sneck	120:00	8	4.00	—	—	0

Source: Hockey Canada
