= Marianne Ihalainen Award =

Finnish ice hockey award

- Sport: Ice hockey
- League: Auroraliiga
- Awarded for: Most points in the Auroraliiga regular season
- Local name: Marianne Ihalainen -palkinto (Finnish)
- Country: Finland
- Presented by: Finnish Ice Hockey Association

History
- First award: 1983
- Editions: 42
- First winner: Anne Haanpää, 1983
- Most wins: Karoliina Rantamäki (6)
- Most recent: Emma Nuutinen, 2026

The Marianne Ihalainen Award (Finnish: Marianne Ihalainen -palkinto) an ice hockey trophy seasonally awarded by the Finnish Ice Hockey Association to the regular season top point scorer of the Auroraliiga, known as the Naisten Liiga during 2017 to 2024, and as the Naisten SM-sarja during 1982 to 2017. It is named after Marianne Ihalainen, former SM-sarja forward and one of the most accomplished women in the history of Finnish ice hockey.

== Award winners ==
Season	Winner	Team	Pts	GP	PpG
1982–83	Anne Haanpää	Ässät Pori	42	7	6.00
1983–84	Sari Krooks	Sport Vaasa	21	4	5.25
1984–85	Anne Haanpää	Ilves Tampere	49	8	6.13
1985–86	Sari Krooks	Sport Vaasa	53	14	3.79
1986–87	Sari Krooks	Sport Vaasa	45	12	3.75
1987–88	Sari Krooks	Sport Vaasa	45	14	3.21
1988–89	Liisa Karikoski	EVU Vantaa	33	13	2.54
1989–90	Marianne Ihalainen	Ilves Tampere	33	12	2.75
1990–91	Johanna Ikonen	Shakers Kerava	28	12	2.33
1991–92	Anne Nurmi	Ilves Tampere	31	14	2.21
1992–93	Liisa Karikoski	Kiekko-Espoo	32	14	2.43
1993–94	Riikka Nieminen	Shakers Kerava	129	21	6.14
1994–95	Sari Fisk	Ilves Tampere	58	24	2.42
1995–96	Petra Vaarakallio	Kiekko-Espoo	48	23	2.09
1996–97	Riikka Nieminen	JyP HT	64	24	2.67
1997–98	Karoliina Rantamäki	Kiekko-Espoo	60	24	2.50
1998–99	Sanna Lankosaari	Kärpät Oulu	48	24	2.00
1999–00	Petra Vaarakallio	Espoo Blues	60	26	2.31
2000–01	Tiia Reima	IHK Helsinki	56	24	2.33
2001–02	Karoliina Rantamäki	Espoo Blues	55	24	2.29
2002–03	Petra Vaarakallio	Espoo Blues	73	23	3.17
2003–04	Karoliina Rantamäki	Espoo Blues	71	24	2.96
2004–05	Karoliina Rantamäki	Espoo Blues	39	20	1.95
2005–06	Karoliina Rantamäki	Espoo Blues	43	22	1.95
2006–07	Karoliina Rantamäki	Espoo Blues	51	22	2.32
2007–08	Eini Lehtinen	Kärpät Oulu	79	20	3.95
2008–09	Michelle Karvinen	Espoo Blues	81	22	3.68
2009–10	Linda Välimäki	Ilves Tampere	77	19	4.05
2010–11	Anne Helin	Kärpät Oulu	51	20	2.55
2011–12	Anne Helin	Kärpät Oulu	76	27	2.81
2012–13	Anne Helin	Kärpät Oulu	69	25	2.76
2013–14	Linda Välimäki	Espoo Blues	71	28	2.54
2014–15	Linda Välimäki	Espoo Blues	65	28	2.32
2015–16	Jenni Hiirikoski	JYP Jyväskylä	79	28	2.82
2016–17	Linda Välimäki	Espoo United	60	28	2.14
2017–18	Linda Välimäki	Ilves Tampere	71	28	2.54
2018–19	Elisa Holopainen	KalPa Kuopio	29	10	2.90
2019–20	Saila Saari	Kärpät Oulu	16	10	1.60
2020–21	Michaela Pejzlová	IFK Helsinki	13	8	1.63
2021–22	Estelle Duvin	TPS Turku	57	26	2.19
2022–23	Michaela Pejzlová	IFK Helsinki	82	31	2.65
2023–24	Michaela Pejzlová	IFK Helsinki	71	24	2.96
2024–25	Emma Nuutinen	Kiekko-Espoo	65	30	2.17
2025–26	Emma Nuutinen	Kiekko-Espoo	63	28	2.25

Source: Elite Prospects

== All time award recipients ==
Player	Wins	Years won
Karoliina Rantamäki	6	1998, 2002, 2004, 2005, 2006, 2007
Linda Välimäki	5	2010, 2014, 2015, 2017, 2018
Sari Krooks	4	1984, 1986, 1987, 1988
Anne Helin	3	2011, 2012, 2013
Michaela Pejzlová	3	2021, 2023, 2024
Petra Vaarakallio	3	1996, 2000, 2003
Anne Haanpää	2	1983, 1985
Liisa Karikoski	2	1989, 1993
Riikka Nieminen	2	1994, 1997
Emma Nuutinen	2	2025, 2026
Estelle Duvin	1	2022
Sari Fisk	1	1995
Jenni Hiirikoski	1	2016
Elisa Holopainen	1	2019
Michelle Karvinen	1	2009
Marianne Ihalainen	1	1990
Johanna Ikonen	1	1991
Sanna Lankosaari	1	1999
Eini Lehtinen	1	2008
Anne Nurmi	1	1992
Saila Saari	1	2020
