= Tiia Reima Award =

Finnish ice hockey award

Tiia Reima Award Tiia Reima -palkinto (Finnish)
- Sport: Ice hockey
- League: Auroraliiga
- Awarded for: Most goals in regular season
- Presented by: Finnish Ice Hockey Association

History
- First award: 1983
- First winner: Anne Haanpää
- Most wins: Karoliina Rantamäki (8)
- Most recent: Emma Nuutinen, 2026

The Tiia Reima Award or Tiia Reima Trophy (Finnish: Tiia Reima -palkinto) is an ice hockey trophy seasonally awarded by the Finnish Ice Hockey Association to the top goal scorer of the Auroraliiga regular season. It is named after Tiia Reima, one of the trailblazers of women's ice hockey in Finland. A prolific goal scorer, Reima has sole possession of fourth on the list of all-time goals in the Auroraliiga (called Naisten SM-sarja during 1982–2017 and Naisten Liiga during 2017–2024), though she was never the single-season top goal scorer in the league.

== Award winners ==
Abbreviations: G = goals; GP = games played; G/GP = goals per game

Season	Winner	Team	GP	G	G/GP
1982–83	Anne Haanpää	Ässät Pori	7	33	4.714
1983–84	Sari Krooks	Sport Vaasa	4	18	4.5
1984–85	Anne Haanpää	Ilves Tampere	8	38	4.75
1985–86	Sari Krooks	Sport Vaasa	14	46	3.286
1986–87	Sari Krooks	Sport Vaasa	12	35	2.916
1987–88	Sari Krooks	Sport Vaasa	14	38	2.714
1988–89	Liisa Karikoski	EVU Vantaa	13	21	1.846
1989–90	Marianne Ihalainen	Ilves Tampere	12	21	1.75
1990–91	Johanna Ikonen	Shakers Kerava	12	20	1.667
1991–92	Anne Nurmi	Ilves Tampere	14	23	1.643
1992–93	Sari Fisk	Ässät Pori	14	22	1.571
1992–93	Johanna Ikonen	JoKP Joensuu	14	22	1.571
1993–94	Riikka Nieminen	Shakers Kerava	21	73	3.476
1994–95	Sari Fisk	Ilves Tampere	24	32	1.333
1995–96	Petra Vaarakallio	Kiekko-Espoo	23	24	1.043
1996–97	Petra Vaarakallio	Kiekko-Espoo	24	30	1.25
1997–98	Karoliina Rantamäki	Kiekko-Espoo	24	38	1.583
1998–99	Sanna Lankosaari	Kärpät Oulu	24	26	1.083
1999–00	Karoliina Rantamäki	Blues Espoo	26	32	1.230
2000–01	Sari Fisk	Ilves Tampere	26	28	1.083
2001–02	Karoliina Rantamäki	Blues Espoo	24	31	1.291
2002–03	Karoliina Rantamäki	Blues Espoo	24	39	1.625
2003–04	Karoliina Rantamäki	Blues Espoo	24	38	1.583
2004–05	Karoliina Rantamäki	Blues Espoo	20	21	1.05
2005–06	Karoliina Rantamäki	Blues Espoo	22	23	1.045
2006–07	Karoliina Rantamäki	Blues Espoo	22	28	1.273
2007–08	Anne Helin	IHK Helsinki	20	34	1.7
2008–09	Michelle Karvinen	Blues Espoo	22	33	1.5
2009–10	Linda Välimäki	Ilves Tampere	19	42	2.211
2010–11	Anne Helin	Kärpät Oulu	20	35	1.75
2011–12	Anne Helin	Kärpät Oulu	27	43	1.593
2012–13	Anne Helin	Kärpät Oulu	25	38	1.52
2013–14	Linda Välimäki	Blues Espoo	28	32	1.143
2014–15	Linda Välimäki	Blues Espoo	28	28	1.0
2015–16	Linda Välimäki	Blues Espoo	28	31	1.107
2016–17	Linda Välimäki	Espoo United	28	29	1.036
2017–18	Linda Välimäki	Ilves Tampere	28	30	1.071
2018–19	Elisa Holopainen	KalPa Kuopio	10	12	1.2
2019–20	Elisa Holopainen	KalPa Kuopio	10	11	1.1
2020–21	Matilda Nilsson	KalPa Kuopio	7	8	1.143
2021–22	Matilda Nilsson	IFK Helsinki	29	37	1.276
2022–23	Elisa Holopainen	KalPa Kuopio	28	41	1.464
2023–24	Lisette Täks	Kiekko-Espoo	32	39	1.219
2024–25	Lisette Täks	Kiekko-Espoo	32	30	0.938
2025–26	Emma Nuutinen	Kiekko-Espoo	28	27	0.964

Source: Elite Prospects

== All-time award winners ==
Player	Wins	Years won
Karoliina Rantamäki	8	1998, 2000, 2002, 2003, 2004, 2005, 2006, 2007
Linda Leppänen (née Välimäki)	6	2010, 2014, 2015, 2016, 2017, 2018
Anne Helin	4	2008, 2011, 2012, 2013
Sari Krooks	4	1984, 1986, 1987, 1988
Elisa Holopainen	3	2019, 2020, 2023
Sari Marjamäki (née Fisk)	3	1993, 1995, 2001
Anne Haanpää	2	1983, 1985
Johanna Ikonen	2	1991, 1993
Matilda Nilsson	2	2021, 2022
Lisette Täks	2	2024, 2025
Petra Vaarakallio	2	1996, 1997
Michelle Karvinen	1	2009
Sanna Lankosaari	1	1999
Anne Nurmi	1	1992
Emma Nuutinen	1	2026
Riikka Sallinen (née Nieminen)	1	1994
