= Marika Lehtimäki =

Finnish ice hockey player

- Born: 7 February 1975 (age 51) Tampere, Finland
- Height: 164 cm (5 ft 5 in)
- Weight: 70 kg (154 lb; 11 st 0 lb)
- Position: Forward
- Shot: Right
- Played for: Tampereen Ilves; Ilves-Kiekko
- National team: Finland
- Playing career: c. 1986–1998
Medal record
Olympic Games
Bronze medal – third place	1998 Nagano	Ice hockey
World Championship
Bronze medal – third place	1994 United States
Bronze medal – third place	1992 Finland
Bronze medal – third place	1990 Canada
European Championship
Gold medal – first place	1995 Latvia
Gold medal – first place	1993 Denmark
Gold medal – first place	1991 Czechoslovakia
Bronze medal – third place	1996 Russia

Marika Johanna Lehtimäki (born 7 February 1975) is a Finnish retired ice hockey player and former member of the Finnish national ice hockey team. She played 83 international matches with the national team and was on the bronze medal winning rosters in the women's tournament at the 1998 Winter Olympics in Nagano and at the IIHF Women's World Championships in 1990, 1992, and 1994. With the Finnish national team she also won four IIHF European Championship medals, three gold and one bronze.

In Finland, she played the majority of her senior club career with the Tampereen Ilves in the Naisten SM-sarja and won four consecutive Finnish Championships with the team from 1990 to 1993. Lehtimäki led the league in assists in the 1994–95 season, notching 28 assists in 24 games, while playing on Ilves' top line with Marianne Ihalainen and Sari Marjamäki.

== Career statistics ==
=== International ===
Year	Team	Event	Result	GP	G	A	Pts	PIM
1990	Finland	WW	3rd place, bronze medalist(s)	5	0	5	5	0
1991	Finland	EW	1st place, gold medalist(s)	5	4	5	9	0
1992	Finland	WW	3rd place, bronze medalist(s)	5	3	2	5	2
1993	Finland	EW	1st place, gold medalist(s)	3	1	4	5	0
1994	Finland	WW	3rd place, bronze medalist(s)	5	2	3	5	0
1995	Finland	EW	1st place, gold medalist(s)	5	7	3	10	0
1996	Finland	EW	3rd place, bronze medalist(s)	5	1	3	4	0
1998	Finland	OG	3rd place, bronze medalist(s)	5	2	3	5	0
Senior totals				38	20	28	48	2
