= Satu Huotari =

Finnish ice hockey player

- Born: 13 March 1967 (age 59) Oulu, Finland
- Height: 162 cm (5 ft 4 in)
- Weight: 63 kg (139 lb; 9 st 13 lb)
- Position: Defense
- Shot: Left
- Played for: Tiikerit Hämeenlinna; Shakers Kerava; Kärpät Oulu
- National team: Finland
- Playing career: 1982–2002
Medal record
Olympic Games
Bronze medal – third place	1998 Nagano	Team
World Championship
Bronze medal – third place	1992 Finland
Bronze medal – third place	1994 United States
Bronze medal – third place	1999 Finland
European Championship
Gold medal – first place	1993 Denmark
Gold medal – first place	1995 Latvia
Bronze medal – third place	1996 Russia

Satu Anne-Marie Huotari (born 13 March 1967) is a Finnish retired ice hockey player. She competed with the Finnish national team from 1991 through 1999 and won a bronze medal in the women's ice hockey tournament at the 1998 Winter Olympics; bronze medals at the IIHF World Women's Championship in 1992, 1994, and 1999; gold medals at the IIHF European Women Championships in 1993 and 1995, and a bronze medal at the 1996 IIHF European Women Championships.

== Career statistics ==
=== Club career ===
Note: GP = Games played; G = Goals; A = Assists; Pts = Points; PIM = Penalty minutes;

			Regular season					Playoffs
Season	Team	League	GP	G	A	Pts	PIM	GP	G	A	Pts	PIM
1982-83	Tiikerit	SM-sarja	8	27	10	37	8	3	3	0	3	2
1983-84	Tiikerit	SM-sarja	6	9	2	11	6	3	1	0	1	2
1984-85	Ilves	SM-sarja	8	9	15	24	2	6	2	4	6	0
1985-86	Ilves	SM-sarja	13	1	5	6	8	—	—	—	—	—
1986-87	Shakers	SM-sarja	13	10	9	19	2	—	—	—	—	—
1987-88	Shakers	SM-sarja	14	7	2	9	8	—	—	—	—	—
1988-89	Shakers	SM-sarja	11	2	2	4	2	—	—	—	—	—
1989-90	Shakers	SM-sarja	12	2	1	3	2	3	0	0	0	2
1990-91	Shakers	SM-sarja	12	6	6	12	10	4	1	2	3	0
1991-92	Shakers	SM-sarja	14	7	6	13	6	5	1	2	3	4
1992-93	Shakers	SM-sarja	14	3	11	14	6	5	4	1	5	8
1993-94	Shakers	SM-sarja	24	19	43	62	14	5	5	6	11	2
1994-95	Shakers	SM-sarja	22	6	21	27	12	6	1	6	7	6
1995-96	Kärpät	SM-sarja	24	7	8	15	37	7	0	2	2	4
1996-97	Kärpät	SM-sarja	19	7	11	18	16	3	2	0	2	0
1997-98	Kärpät	SM-sarja	20	9	10	19	18	5	1	1	2	0
1998-99	Kärpät	SM-sarja	23	2	13	15	14	4	0	1	1	4
1999-00	Kärpät	SM-sarja	10	1	6	7	14	8	3	4	7	4
2000-01	Kärpät	SM-sarja	25	1	5	6	34	9	1	1	2	4
2001-02	Kärpät	SM-sarja	1	0	0	0	2	—	—	—	—	—

=== International ===
Note: GP = Games played; G = Goals; A = Assists; Pts = Points; PIM = Penalty minutes;

				Regular season
Year	Team	Event	Result	GP	G	A	Pts	PIM
1992	Finland	WC	3rd place, bronze medalist(s)	5	0	2	2	4
1993	Finland	EC	1st place, gold medalist(s)	3	0	2	2	2
1994	Finland	WC	3rd place, bronze medalist(s)	5	2	4	6	2
1995	Finland	EC	1st place, gold medalist(s)	5	1	3	4	8
1996	Finland	EC	3rd place, bronze medalist(s)	6	0	0	0	4
1998	Finland	OG	3rd place, bronze medalist(s)	6	0	1	1	4
1999	Finland	WC	3rd place, bronze medalist(s)	5	0	0	0	0
