= Ice hockey at the 1998 Winter Olympics – Women's tournament =

1998 Winter Olympics

Tournament details
- Host country: Japan
- Venues: 2 (in 1 host city)
- Dates: 8–17 February
- Teams: 6

Final positions
- Champions: United States (1st title)
- Runners-up: Canada
- Third place: Finland
- Fourth place: China

Tournament statistics
- Games played: 17
- Goals scored: 119 (7 per game)
- Attendance: 81,707 (4,806 per game)
- Scoring leader: (Finland) Riikka Nieminen (12 points)

The 1998 Olympic women's ice hockey tournament was the first year that featured women in ice hockey competition. It was anticipated that the women's gold medal match would feature Canada versus the United States. Canada was favored to come out on top as they had won all the competitions in previous years in women's hockey, with the United States perpetually finishing second, while no other national teams could match their level of play. However, the United States beat Canada in the final and became the first country to win gold in women's ice hockey at the Olympics.

Petra Vaarakallio scored the first-ever goal in women's ice hockey at the Olympics in 1998. She had won bronze at the 1992 World Ringette Championships but stopped playing ringette after receiving a six-month suspension for kicking an opponent who was lying on the ice.

There were no qualification tournaments, the host Japan played alongside the top five nations at the previous season's World Championships.

== Preliminary round ==
Pos	Team	Pld	W	D	L	GF	GA	GD	Pts	Qualification
1	United States	5	5	0	0	33	7	+26	10	Gold medal game
2	Canada	5	4	0	1	28	12	+16	8	Gold medal game
3	Finland	5	3	0	2	27	10	+17	6	Bronze medal game
4	China	5	2	0	3	10	15	−5	4	Bronze medal game
5	Sweden	5	1	0	4	10	21	−11	2	
6	Japan (H)	5	0	0	5	2	45	−43	0	

(H) Hosts

All times are local (UTC+9).

8 February 1998; 12:00	Sweden	0–6 (0–2, 0–2, 0–2)	Finland	Aqua Wing Arena; Attendance: 2,208

Game reference

Annica Åhlén
Goalies
Tuula Puputti
Referee:
Marina Zenk
Linesmen:
Debra Parece
Evonne Young

0–1	08:35 – Vaarakallio (Huotari)
0–2	15:17 – Ikonen (Selin) (PP)
0–3	22:35 – Reima (Fisk)
0–4	34:07 – Nieminen (Reima)
0–5	55:11 – Krooks
0–6	58:20 – Ikonen

16 min
Penalties
12 min
12
Shots
28

8 February 1998; 16:00	Canada	13–0 (3–0, 6–0, 4–0)	Japan	Aqua Wing Arena; Attendance: 4,597

Game reference

Lesley Reddon
Manon Rhéaume
Goalies
Haruka Watanabe
Yuka Oda
Referee:
Victoria Renfer-Kale
Linesmen:
Johanna Kuisma
Sigrid Nonas

Goyette (Wickenheiser) – 05:46	1–0
Heaney – 15:42	2–0
Wickenheiser (Wilson, Campbell) – 17:05	3–0
Goyette (Wilson, Brisson) – 24:23	4–0
Brisson (Wickenheiser) – 28:12	5–0
Campbell (Diduck) – 31:22	6–0
Wilson (Goyette) – 35:43	7–0
Kellar (Sunohara) – 36:14	8–0
Wickenheiser (Wilson) (PP) – 38:08	9–0
Diduck (Campbell) – 53:52	10–0
St-Louis (Heaney, Kellar) (PP) – 55:26	11–0
Goyette – 56:21	12–0
Smith (St-Louis) (PP) – 58:06	13–0

12 min
Penalties
12 min
64
Shots
3

8 February 1998; 20:00	China	0–5 (0–2, 0–1, 0–2)	United States	Aqua Wing Arena; Attendance: 3,255

Game reference

Guo Hong
Goalies
Sarah Tueting
Referee:
Laurie Taylor-Bolton
Linesmen:
Isabelle Giguère
Sandra Dombrowski

0–1	07:39 – Granato (Ulion, Schmidgall) (PP)
0–2	19:17 – Bye (Mounsey) (PP)
0–3	34:53 – Mounsey (King)
0–4	51:05 – Schmidgall (Bye)
0–5	56:20 – Granato (King)

14 min
Penalties
10 min
10
Shots
31

9 February 1998; 12:00	Finland	11–1 (2–0, 3–0, 6–1)	Japan	Aqua Wing Arena; Attendance: 4,972

Game reference

Liisa-Maria Sneck
Goalies
Haruka Watanabe
Yuka Oda
Referee:
Laurie Taylor-Bolton
Linesmen:
Sigrid Nonas
Evonne Young

Lankosaari (Riipi, Krooks) – 03:54	1–0
Riipi (Lankosaari) – 18:45	2–0
Reima (Fisk, Hänninen) – 27:22	3–0
Hänninen (PP) – 33:29	4–0
Hänninen (Nieminen, Ikonen) (PP) – 38:23	5–0
Rantamäki – 45:43	6–0
	6–1	48:28 – Hatanaka (Fujiwara, Yoshimi) (PP)
Nieminen (Lehto) – 49:06	7–1
Krooks – 49:52	8–1
Hänninen (Nieminen) (PP) – 50:42	9–1
Lehto (Nieminen) – 52:55	10–1
Nieminen (Fisk, Lehtimäki) – 54:40	11–1

16 min
Penalties
42 min
49
Shots
9

9 February 1998; 16:00	United States	7–1 (1–1, 4–0, 2–0)	Sweden	Aqua Wing Arena; Attendance: 3,607

Game reference

Sara DeCosta
Goalies
Annica Åhlén
Referee:
Manuela Gröger
Linesmen:
Isabelle Giguère
Marina Zenk

	0–1	10:02 – Morelius (Sjölander, Holst) (PP)
Baker (Merz) – 16:27	1–1
Bye (Merz, Mounsey) (PP) – 32:39	2–1
King (Blahoski) – 34:26	3–1
Merz – 36:20	4–1
Bye (SH) – 38:39	5–1
Ulion (Granato) (PP) – 54:28	6–1
Looney (SH) – 55:30	7–1

14 min
Penalties
24 min
47
Shots
3

9 February 1998; 20:00	Canada	2–0 (0–0, 2–0, 0–0)	China	Aqua Wing Arena; Attendance: 2,713

Game reference
Manon Rhéaume	Goalies	Guo Hong	Referee: Sandra Dombrowski; Linesmen: Johanna Kuisma; Debra Parece
Goyette (Wickenheiser) – 24:38 / 1–0; Sunohara (Heaney) (PP) – 35:38 / 2–0			Referee: Sandra Dombrowski; Linesmen: Johanna Kuisma; Debra Parece
6 min	Penalties	14 min	Referee: Sandra Dombrowski; Linesmen: Johanna Kuisma; Debra Parece
40	Shots	8	Referee: Sandra Dombrowski; Linesmen: Johanna Kuisma; Debra Parece

11 February 1998; 12:00	Sweden	3–5 (0–2, 2–2, 1–1)	Canada	Aqua Wing Arena; Attendance: 5,429

Game reference

Charlotte Göthesson
Goalies
Lesley Reddon
Referee:
Victoria Renfer-Kale
Linesmen:
Debra Parece
Evonne Young

	0–1	09:30 – Goyette
	0–2	10:06 – Nystrom (Drolet)
	0–3	26:23 – Drolet (Kellar) (PP)
Rooth (Almblad) – 28:38	1–3
	1–4	35:05 – Brisson (SH)
Burholm (Holst) (PP) – 38:11	2–4
	2–5	40:34 – Goyette (Wickenheiser, Wilson)
Månsson (Sjölander) – 42:11	3–5

34 min
Penalties
20 min
11
Shots
38

11 February 1998; 16:00	Japan	1–6 (0–0, 0–3, 1–3)	China	Aqua Wing Arena; Attendance: 5,863

Game reference

Yuka Oda
Goalies
Guo Hong
Referee:
Manuela Gröger
Linesmen:
Johanna Kuisma
Sigrid Nonas

	0–1	32:21 – Yang (Li, Liu H.)
	0–2	32:35 – Guo W. (Yang)
	0–3	33:45 – Zhang L. (Lu)
M. Sato (Obikawa) (PP) – 22:25	1–3
	1–4	46:31 – Guo W. (Gong) (PP)
	1–5	52:24 – Sang (Xu)
	1–6	55:19 – Guo W. (Liu H.)

12 min
Penalties
18 min
7
Shots
44

11 February 1998; 20:00	United States	4–2 (1–1, 3–1, 0–0)	Finland	Aqua Wing Arena; Attendance: 3,688

Game reference

Sarah Tueting
Goalies
Tuula Puputti
Referee:
Marina Zenk
Linesmen:
Isabelle Giguère
Laurie Taylor-Bolton

Movsessian (King) – 02:48	1–0
	1–1	18:09 – Hänninen (Lehto, Nieminen) (PP)
Bye (Schmidgall) – 21:22	2–1
	2–2	25:27 – Nieminen (SH)
Mounsey (Bye, Merz) (PP) – 26:49	3–2
Ulion (Bye) – 36:56	4–2

18 min
Penalties
10 min
25
Shots
22

12 February 1998; 12:00	China	3–1 (0–0, 0–1, 3–0)	Sweden	Aqua Wing Arena; Attendance: 3,670

Guo Hong
Goalies
Annica Åhlén
Referee:
Marina Zenk
Linesmen:
Johanna Kuisma
Debra Parece

	0–1	31:10 – Sjölander (Almblad)
Zhang L. (Yang, Liu H.) – 46:42	1–1
Liu H. (Wang) – 50:38	2–1
Yang (Zhang L., Guo W.) – 58:08	3–1

8 min
Penalties
10 min
23
Shots
23

12 February 1998; 16:00	United States	10–0 (5–0, 2–0, 3–0)	Japan	Aqua Wing Arena; Attendance: 5,015

Sara DeCosta
Goalies
Haruka Watanabe
Yuka Oda
Referee:
Laurie Taylor-Bolton
Linesmen:
Isabelle Giguère
Sigrid Nonas

Looney – 03:55	1–0
Mleczko (Merz) – 09:08	2–0
Whyte (Granato) – 13:32	3–0
Looney (Ulion, Schmidgall) (PP) – 14:14	4–0
Mleczko (Brown-Miller, Looney) – 14:36	5–0
King (Baker, Bailey) – 29:18	6–0
King (Blahoski, Baker) – 39:34	7–0
Baker (Granato) (PP) – 45:37	8–0
Bye (Mounsey, Ulion) (PP) – 51:46	9–0
King (Baker) – 53:03	10–0

8 min
Penalties
12 min
56
Shots
4

12 February 1998; 20:00	Finland	2–4 (0–2, 1–2, 1–0)	Canada	Aqua Wing Arena; Attendance: 3,133

Liisa-Maria Sneck
Tuula Puputti
Goalies
Manon Rhéaume
Referee:
Sandra Dombrowski
Linesmen:
Manuela Gröger
Evonne Young

	0–1	12:45 – Brisson (Sunohara) (PP)
	0–2	16:50 – Heaney (Drolet) (PP)
	0–3	28:53 – Brisson (St-Louis)
Vaarakallio (Fisk) – 33:25	1–3
	1–4	36:26 – Goyette (Heaney, Diduck) (PP)
Rantamäki (Vaarakallio) – 53:32	2–4

10 min
Penalties
10 min
21
Shots
23

14 February 1998; 12:00	Japan	0–5 (0–2, 0–2, 0–1)	Sweden	Aqua Wing Arena; Attendance: 6,009

Yuka Oda
Goalies
Charlotte Götesson
Referee:
Sandra Dombrowski
Linesmen:
Isabelle Giguère
Debra Parece

0–1	10:58 – Andersson (PP)
0–2	18:33 – Holst (Elfsberg)
0–3	25:34 – Gustafsson (Elfving)
0–4	31:15 – Rooth (Andersson, Holst) (PP)
0–5	59:18 – Holst (Rooth)

12 min
Penalties
14 min
15
Shots
30

14 February 1998; 16:00	Finland	6–1 (2–0, 2–1, 2–0)	China	Aqua Wing Arena; Attendance: 5,638

Tuula Puputti
Goalies
Huo Lina
Guo Hong
Referee:
Victoria Renfer-Kale
Linesmen:
Laurie Taylor-Bolton
Evonne Young

Ikonen – 01:08	1–0
Lehtimäki (Hänninen) – 09:56	2–0
Fisk (Lehtimäki) – 24:37	3–0
	3–1	24:50 – Liu H. (Wang)
Nieminen (SH) – 27:57	4–1
Lehtimäki (Hänninen) – 44:20	5–1
Nieminen – 57:09	6–1

8 min
Penalties
6 min
33
Shots
9

14 February 1998; 20:00	Canada	4–7 (1–1, 0–0, 3–6)	United States	Aqua Wing Arena; Attendance: 5,872

Lesley Reddon
Goalies
Sarah Tueting
Sara DeCosta
Referee:
Manuela Gröger
Linesmen:
Johanna Kuisma
Sigrid Nonas

Dupuis (Sunohara) (PP) – 03:01	1–0
	1–1	19:20 – Granato (PP)
Dupuis (Brisson) (PP) – 41:24	2–1
Hefford (Dupuis) (PP2) – 45:28	3–1
Brisson (Wilson, Wickenheiser) (PP) – 45:53	4–1
	4–2	47:05 – Baker (King)
	4–3	50:57 – Granato (Ulion, Mounsey) (PP2)
	4–4	52:25 – Schmidgall (Granato) (PP)
	4–5	52:48 – Dunn (Mleczko)
	4–6	57:06 – Brown-Miller (Mleczko)
	4–7	58:58 – Baker (ENG)

18 min
Penalties
30 min
35
Shots
30

== Final round ==
=== Bronze medal game ===
17 February 1998; 14:00	(bronze) Finland	4–1 (0–1, 3–0, 1–0)	China	Big Hat; Attendance: 7,412

Game reference

Tuula Puputti
Goalies
Guo Hong
Referee:
Laurie Taylor-Bolton
Linesmen:
Johanna Kuisma
Evonne Young

	0–1	09:27 − Yang
Fisk (Nieminen, Lehto) − 23:07	1–1
Ikonen (Vaarakallio, Rantamäki) − 27:08	2–1
Lankosaari (Riipi, Krooks) − 30:15	3–1
Nieminen (Lehtimäki) (ENG) − 59:52	4–1

0 min
Penalties
8 min
23
Shots
9

=== Gold medal game ===
17 February 1998; 18:00	(gold) United States	3–1 (0–0, 1–0, 2–1)	Canada (silver)	Big Hat; Attendance: 8,626

Game reference

Sarah Tueting
Goalies
Manon Rhéaume
Referee:
Marina Zenk
Linesmen:
Isabelle Giguère
Debra Parece

Ulion (Whyte, Merz) (PP) − 22:38	1–0
Looney (Whyte, Ulion) (PP) − 50:57	2–0
	2–1	55:59 − Goyette (Wickenheiser, Heaney) (PP)
Whyte (ENG) − 59:52	3–1

8 min
Penalties
6 min
24
Shots
22

== Medalists ==
Event	Gold	Silver	Bronze
Women's tournament	United States; Alana Blahoski; A. J. Mleczko; Angela Ruggiero; Cammi Granato (C); Chris Bailey; Colleen Coyne; Lisa Brown-Miller; Gretchen Ulion; Jenny Schmidgall; Karyn Bye (A); Katie King; Laurie Baker; Tricia Dunn; Sandra Whyte; Sara DeCosta (G); Sarah Tueting (G); Shelley Looney; Sue Merz; Tara Mounsey; Vicki Movsessian Head coach: Ben Smith	Canada; Becky Kellar; Cassie Campbell; Danielle Goyette; Fiona Smith; France Saint-Louis; Geraldine Heaney; Hayley Wickenheiser; Jayna Hefford; Jennifer Botterill; Judy Diduck; Karen Nystrom; Kathy McCormack; Laura Schuler; Lesley Reddon (G); Lori Dupuis; Manon Rhéaume (G); Nancy Drolet; Stacy Wilson (C); Thérèse Brisson (A); Vicky Sunohara Head coach: Shannon Miller	Finland; Emma Terho; Riikka Nieminen (A); Johanna Ikonen; Karoliina Rantamäki; Katja Riipi; Katja Lehto; Kirsi Hänninen (A); Liisa-Maria Sneck (G); Maria Selin; Marianne Ihalainen (C); Marika Lehtimäki; Marja-Helena Pälvilä; Päivi Salo; Petra Vaarakallio; Sanna Lankosaari; Sari Fisk; Sari Krooks; Satu Huotari; Tiia Reima; Tuula Puputti (G) Head coach: Rauno Korpi

== Final rankings ==
Pos	Team	Pld	W	D	L	GF	GA	GD	Pts
1st place, gold medalist(s)	United States	6	6	0	0	36	8	+28	12
2nd place, silver medalist(s)	Canada	6	4	0	2	29	15	+14	8
3rd place, bronze medalist(s)	Finland	6	4	0	2	31	11	+20	8
4	China	6	2	0	4	11	19	−8	4
5	Sweden	5	1	0	4	10	21	−11	2
6	Japan (H)	5	0	0	5	2	45	−43	0

(H) Hosts

1998 Women's Olympic champions

United States
1st title

== Statistics ==
=== Scoring leaders ===
List shows the top ten skaters sorted by points, then goals.

Player	GP	G	A	Pts	+/−	PIM	POS
(Finland) Riikka Nieminen	6	7	5	12	+14	4	F
(Canada) Danielle Goyette	6	8	1	9	+10	10	F
(United States) Karyn Bye	6	5	3	8	+4	4	F
(United States) Cammi Granato	6	4	4	8	+2	0	F
(United States) Katie King	6	4	4	8	+10	2	F
(United States) Gretchen Ulion	6	3	5	8	3	4	F
(Canada) Hayley Wickenheiser	6	2	6	8	+7	4	F
(Canada) Thérèse Brisson	6	5	2	7	+5	6	D
(United States) Laurie Baker	6	4	3	7	+10	6	F
(Finland) Kirsi Hänninen	6	4	3	7	+13	6	D

GP = Games played; G = Goals; A = Assists; Pts = Points; +/− = P Plus–minus; PIM = Penalties in minutes; POS = Position
Source: eurohockey.com

=== Leading goaltenders ===
Only the top five goaltenders, based on save percentage, who have played at least 40% of their team's minutes, are included in this list.

Player	TOI	GA	SA	Sv%	SO
(United States) Sarah Tueting	210	4	64	93.75	1
(Canada) Manon Rhéaume	208	4	54	92.59	1
(Sweden) Charlotte Göthesson	120	5	53	90.57	1
(Finland) Tuula Puputti	271	7	67	89.55	1
(China) Guo Hong	350	16	150	89.33	0

TOI = Time on ice (minutes); GA = Goals against; SA = Shots against; Sv% = Save percentage; SO = Shutouts

== Broadcasts ==
Television broadcasts of the women's tournament by The Sports Network were produced by Paul Graham.

== See also ==
- Ice hockey at the Winter Olympics
- Ice hockey at the 1998 Winter Olympics – Men's tournament
