= Anne Haanpää =

Finnish ice hockey official and player

- Born: 25 May 1959 (age 67) Tampere, Finland
- Height: 174 cm (5 ft 9 in)
- Weight: 72 kg (159 lb; 11 st 5 lb)
- Position: Forward
- Shot: Left
- Played for: Tampereen Ilves; Keravan Shakers; Porin Ässät
- National team: Finland
- Playing career: 1982–1998
Medal record
World Championship
Bronze medal – third place	1990 Canada
Bronze medal – third place	1992 Finland
Bronze medal – third place	1994 United States
Bronze medal – third place	1997 Canada
European Championship
Gold medal – first place	1989 West Germany
Gold medal – first place	1991 Czechoslovakia
Gold medal – first place	1993 Denmark
Gold medal – first place	1995 Latvia
Bronze medal – third place	1996 Russia

Anne-Kristiina Haanpää née Bäckman (born 25 May 1959) is a Finnish retired ice hockey forward and referee.

== International play ==
As a member of the Finnish women's national team, Haanpää participated in four IIHF Women's World Championships – in 1990, 1992, 1994, and 1997 – and helped Finland capture a bronze medal at each tournament. Across 20 world championship games, she scored 8 goals and added 6 assists.

Haanpää also represented Finland at five IIHF European Women Championships, winning four gold medals and one bronze.

== Awards and honors ==
Haanpää was inducted into the referee category of the Hockey Hall of Fame Finland as Jääkiekkoleijona #227 in recognition of her contributions as a trailblazer for women in on-ice officiating.

Award or honor		Period
International
European Championship Gold Medal		1989, 1991, 1993, 1995
World Championship Bronze Medal		1990, 1992, 1994, 1997
European Championship Bronze Medal		1996
Naisten SM-sarja
Most Goals, regular season		1982–83, 1984–85
Most Points, regular season		1982–83, 1984–85
Finnish Champion	with Ilves	1984–85, 1985–86, 1987–88, 1989–90, 1990–91
Finnish Champion	with Shakers	1993–94, 1994–95, 1995–96
Other
Suomen Jääkiekkoleijona; Hockey Hall of Fame Finland		2014
