= Kirsi Hänninen =

Finnish ice hockey player

- Born: 3 October 1976 (age 50) Joensuu, Finland
- Height: 1.75 m (5 ft 9 in)
- Weight: 68 kg (150 lb; 10 st 10 lb)
- Position: Defence
- Shot: Left
- Played for: JoKP Joensuu; Kiekko-Espoo; JYP Jyväskylä; KalPa Kuopio; Oulun Kärpät
- National team: Finland
- Playing career: 1992–2002
Medal record
Olympic Games
Bronze medal – third place	1998 Nagano	Ice hockey
World Championship
Bronze medal – third place	2000 Canada
Bronze medal – third place	1999 Finland
Bronze medal – third place	1997 Canada
Bronze medal – third place	1994 United States
European Championship
Gold medal – first place	1995 Latvia
Gold medal – first place	1993 Denmark
Bronze medal – third place	1996 Russia

Kirsi Maaria Hänninen (born 3 October 1976 in Joensuu, Finland) is a Finnish retired ice hockey defenceman and pesäpallo player. She played 116 games with the Finnish national ice hockey team and won a bronze medal with them in the women's ice hockey tournament at the 1998 Winter Olympics.

== Playing career ==
Over her ten-year ice hockey career, Hänninen played with five different teams in the Naisten SM-sarja, the highest level women's hockey league in Finland. She spent four seasons, from 1996 to 2000, with JYP Jyväskylä and won the SM-sarja Championship with them in 1996 and 1997. She also played with JoKP (1992–93), Kiekko-Espoo (1993–94), KalPa (1995–96), and Oulun Kärpät (2001-02).

Hänninen is well known in Finland for her career in the Superpesis, Finland's top pesäpallo league, where she competed from 1993 to 2005 and was a five-time Finnish Champion.

== Personal life ==
Hänninen is a founding member of VRT Finland, an underwater structural inspection company operating in the Baltic Sea and Central Europe, and ias CEO of the company.

== Career statistics ==
=== Regular season and playoffs ===
Note: GP = Games played; G = Goals; A = Assists; Pts = Points; PIM = Penalty minutes;

			Regular season					Playoffs
Season	Team	League	GP	G	A	Pts	PIM	GP	G	A	Pts	PIM
1992-93	JoKP	SM-sarja	12	9	7	16	18	3	0	1	1	4
1993-94	Kiekko-Espoo	SM-sarja	19	12	13	25	32	3	1	1	2	4
1994-95	JYP	I-divisioona	8	7	19	26	10	—	—	—	—	—
1995-96	KalPa	SM-sarja	23	9	21	30	66	3	1	0	1	2
1996-97	JyP HT	SM-sarja	22	11	15	26	32	6	2	3	5	8
1997-98	JYP	SM-sarja	14	8	9	17	12	6	3	3	6	6
1998-99	JYP	SM-sarja	19	13	12	25	30	7	0	3	3	20
1999-00	JYP	SM-sarja	25	20	17	37	34	4	1	1	2	6
2000-01	Kärpät	SM-sarja	9	5	3	8	10	4	0	1	1	4

=== International ===
Note: GP = Games played; G = Goals; A = Assists; Pts = Points; PIM = Penalty minutes;

				Regular season
Year	Team	Event	Result	GP	G	A	Pts	PIM
1993	Finland	EC	1st place, gold medalist(s)	3	3	1	4	6
1994	Finland	WC	3rd place, bronze medalist(s)	6	0	1	1	2
1995	Finland	EC	1st place, gold medalist(s)	5	2	6	8	4
1996	Finland	EC	3rd place, bronze medalist(s)	5	1	1	2	2
1997	Finland	WC	3rd place, bronze medalist(s)	5	2	3	5	8
1998	Finland	OG	3rd place, bronze medalist(s)	6	4	3	7	6
1999	Finland	WC	3rd place, bronze medalist(s)	5	5	5	10	2
2000	Finland	WC	3rd place, bronze medalist(s)	5	1	2	3	4
2002	Finland	OG	4th	5	0	3	3	0

== Awards and honors ==
Ice Hockey
Award	Year
Naisten SM-sarja Champion	1997 (JyP HT) 1998 (JYP)
Most Points by a Defenceman in the Olympic Ice Hockey women's tournament	1998 (7 points) tied with Thérèse Brisson
Best Defenceman in the IIHF World Women's Championships	1999
IIHF World Women's Championships All-Star Team	1999
Suomen Jääkiekkoleijona; Inducted to the Hockey Hall of Fame Finland	2018

Pesäpallo
Award	Year
Superpesis Best Runner Most Runs in the Regular Season	1995, 1996, 2000
Superpesis Champion	1996 (Jyväskylän Kiri) 1997 (Jyväskylän Kiri) 2000 (PattU)
Finnish Pesäpallo Association Player of the Year Suomen Pesäpalloliitto Naispesäpalloilijaksi	2000, 2004
Superpesis Best Batter Most Hits in the Regular Season	2004
Superpesis Golden Bat Player-elected Best Offensive Player	2004
