= Sanna Lankosaari =

Finnish ice hockey player and coach

- Born: 20 August 1978 (age 48) Kemi, Lapland, Finland
- Height: 162 cm (5 ft 4 in)
- Weight: 63 kg (139 lb; 9 st 13 lb)
- Position: Right wing
- Shot: Left
- Played for: Oulun Kärpät; Itä-Helsingin Kiekko; SC Reinach; DSC Oberthurgau; HPK Hämmenlinna
- Coached for: Oulun Kärpät; Espoo Blues
- National team: Finland
- Playing career: 1994–2012
- Coaching career: 2018–present
Medal record
Olympic Games
Bronze medal – third place	1998 Nagano	Ice hockey
World Championship
Bronze medal – third place	1997 Canada
Bronze medal – third place	1999 Finland
Bronze medal – third place	2000 Canada
European Championship
Bronze medal – third place	1996 Russia

Sanna Kristiina Lankosaari (born 20 August 1978) is a Finnish ice hockey coach and retired player. She most recently served as head coach of Oulun Kärpät Naiset in the Naisten Liiga (NSML) during the 2022–23 season and part of the 2023–24 season.

Lankosaari was a right winger with the Finnish national ice hockey team during 1994 to 2003 and won bronze in the women's ice hockey tournament at the 1998 Winter Olympics in Nagano.

== Playing career ==
Lankosaari made her senior club debut with Oulun Kärpät Naiset in the 1994–95 season of the Naisten SM-sarja (renamed Naisten Liiga in 2017). She immediately became the team's second highest scoring player, recording 29 goals and 12 assists for 41 points in 24 games – averaging 1.71 points per game and more than a goal per game. Lankosaari continued with Kärpät for another six seasons, during which she was a four-time point leader for the team and, in the 1998–99 season, led the entire Naisten SM-sarja with both the most goals and most points scored.

Ahead of the 2001–02 season, after initially making plans to join the Tampereen Ilves Naiset, she instead relocated to Helsinki and signed with Itä-Helsingin Kiekko Naiset (IHK Naiset). With IHK, she joined a roster that featured a number of national team teammates, including former Kärpät teammate Katja Riipi. Lankosaari played on the top line and ranked second on the team and fourth in the league for scoring, with 38 points (22+16) in 22 games played. IHK faced the Espoo Blues Naiset in the 2002 Finnish Championship finals and, despite the team's loss in the gold medal game, the Finnish Ice Hockey Association named Lankosaari Playoff MVP.

In 2002, she moved to Switzerland to play with SC Reinach in the Leistungsklasse A (LKA; renamed SWHL A in 2014 and Women's League in 2019). After two seasons with Reinach, she moved to DSC Oberthurgau and played the 2004–05 LKA season there. She officially retired in the spring of 2005 at age 26.

Lankosaari made a comeback in 2009, joining HPK Hämeenlinna in the Naisten SM-sarja. She played with HPK for three seasons, winning the Finnish Championship in 2011 as part of the first team to be awarded the Aurora Borealis Cup. With HPK, she also won a bronze medal in the 2011–12 IIHF European Women's Champions Cup and was named to the tournament All-Star team.

== International play ==
Lankosaari was a member of the Finnish national team during 1994 to 2003. Her first major international tournament was the 1996 IIHF European Women Championships, at which her 8 points (7+1) in five games led all Finnish players and ranked second of all tournament skaters in scoring and she was named to the tournament All-Star team.

Her first IIHF Women's World Championship appearance was in the 1997 IIHF Women's World Championship, where her team won bronze.

Lankosaari was selected to represent Finland in the inaugural Olympic women's ice hockey tournament at the 1998 Winter Olympics. At eighteen years and five months of age, she was the second-youngest player selected to the team – only out-aging sixteen year old teammate and youngest player in the tournament Emma Laaksonen – and joined teammate Katja Riipi as one of two Lapland-born members of the contingent. As of 2022, she remains one of only three women’s ice hockey players from Lapland to represent Finland at the Olympic Games, along with Riipi and Sini Karjalainen. Lankosaari played in five of six games, recording a goal and an assist against Japan in the preliminary round and netting the third goal in Finland’s 4–1 victory against China in the bronze medal game.

Her scoring contributions continued at the 1999 IIHF Women's World Championship, where she notched 3 goals and 2 assists for 5 points in five games played and took home her second World Championship bronze medal. At the 2000 IIHF Women's World Championship, her last major tournament with the national team, she tallied 4 assists in five games and capped her international career with a third World Championship bronze medal.

== Coaching career ==
Lankosaari began coaching in the 2018–19 Naisten Liiga season, briefly serving as an assistant coach to the Espoo Blues Naiset before transferring to Oulun Kärpät Naiset, where she served as an assistant coach to head coach Mira Kuisma. She continued in the assistant coach capacity with head coach Janne Salmela during the 2019–20 and 2020–21 seasons, and Samuli Hassi during the 2021–22 season.

== Career statistics ==
=== International ===
Year	Team	Event	Result	GP	G	A	Pts	PIM
1996	Finland	EC	3rd place, bronze medalist(s)	5	7	1	8	2
1997	Finland	WW	3rd place, bronze medalist(s)	5	0	1	1	2
1998	Finland	OG	3rd place, bronze medalist(s)	5	2	1	3	4
1999	Finland	WW	3rd place, bronze medalist(s)	5	3	2	5	2
2000	Finland	WW	3rd place, bronze medalist(s)	5	0	4	4	6
Senior totals				25	12	9	21	16

== Honors and achievements ==
Award	Year
Naisten SM-sarja
Most points	1998–99
Most goals	1998–99
Playoff MVP	2002
Aurora Borealis Cup Champion	2011 (HPK)
Other
European Champions Cup Bronze Medal	2011–12
European Champions Cup All-Star	2011–12
International
European Championship Bronze Medal	1996
European Championship All-Star	1996
World Championship Bronze Medal	1997, 1999, 2000
Olympic Bronze Medal	1998
