= Katja Lehto =

Finnish ice hockey player

- Born: 14 August 1972 (age 54) Jyväskylä, Finland
- Height: 160 cm (5 ft 3 in)
- Weight: 58 kg (128 lb; 9 st 2 lb)
- Position: Defence
- Shot: Left
- Played for: JYP Jyväskylä; KalPa Kuopio
- National team: Finland
- Playing career: 1994–2000
Medal record
Women's ice hockey
Representing Finland
Olympic Games
Bronze medal – third place	1998 Nagano	Ice hockey
World Championship
Bronze medal – third place	2000 Canada
Bronze medal – third place	1999 Finland
Bronze medal – third place	1997 Ontario
European Championship
Gold medal – first place	1995 Latvia

Katja Maarit Lehto (born 14 August 1972) is a Finnish retired ice hockey player. She played with the Finnish national ice hockey team throughout the 1990s and won a bronze medal at the inaugural Olympic women's ice hockey tournament at the 1998 Winter Olympics. With the national team, she also won bronze at the IIHF Women's World Championships in 1999 and 2000, and gold at the 1995 IIHF European Women Championship.

Lehto's club career was played in the Naisten SM-sarja with KalPa Naiset and JYP Naiset. After retiring from play, she worked as the general manager for JYP Naiset in the 2014–15 and 2015–2016 seasons.

== Career statistics ==
=== Club career ===
Note: GP = Games played; G = Goals; A = Assists; Pts = Points; PIM = Penalty minutes;

			Regular season					Playoffs
Season	Team	League	GP	G	A	Pts	PIM	GP	G	A	Pts	PIM
1994-95	JYP Naiset	Naisten Mestis	7	2	5	7	0	—	—	—	—	—
1995-96	KalPa Naiset	Naisten SM-sarja	23	1	8	9	4	3	0	0	0	0
1996-97	JYP Naiset	Naisten SM-sarja	22	5	12	17	10	6	1	3	4	0
1997-98	JYP Naiset	Naisten SM-sarja	24	2	14	16	8	6	1	1	2	4
1998-99	JYP Naiset	Naisten SM-sarja	23	5	15	20	14	7	1	0	1	2
1999-00	JYP Naiset	Naisten SM-sarja	23	3	18	21	12	4	1	0	1	4

=== International ===
Note: GP = Games played; G = Goals; A = Assists; Pts = Points; PIM = Penalty minutes;

				Regular season
Year	Team	Event	Result	GP	G	A	Pts	PIM
1995	Finland	EC	1st place, gold medalist(s)	5	0	1	1	2
1997	Finland	WC	3rd place, bronze medalist(s)	5	0	4	4	0
1998	Finland	OG	3rd place, bronze medalist(s)	6	1	3	4	0
1999	Finland	WC	3rd place, bronze medalist(s)	5	0	7	7	5
2000	Finland	WC	3rd place, bronze medalist(s)	4	1	0	1	2
