= Alana Blahoski =

American ice hockey player

- Born: April 29, 1974 (age 52) Saint Paul, Minnesota, U.S.
- Height: 5 ft 7 in (170 cm)
- Weight: 126 lb (57 kg; 9 st 0 lb)
- Position: Forward
- Hockey East team: Providence
- National team: United States
- Playing career: 1992–2001
Medal record
Event	1st	2nd	3rd
Olympic Games	1	0	0
World Championship	0	4	0
Total	1	4	0
Women's ice hockey
Representing United States
Olympic Games
Gold medal – first place	1998 Nagano	Team
World Championship
Silver medal – second place	1997 Canada	Team
Silver medal – second place	1999 Finland	Team
Silver medal – second place	2000 Canada	Team
Silver medal – second place	2001 United States	Team

Alana Olga Blahoski (born April 29, 1974) is an American ice hockey player from Saint Paul, Minnesota. She won a gold medal at the 1998 Winter Olympics. She graduated from Johnson High School in Saint Paul and played ice hockey at Providence College.

Blahoski coached Djurgårdens IF Hockey 2018–20.
