= Yuka Oda =

Japanese ice hockey player

Yuka Oda 小田 由香
- Born: 15 March 1973 (age 52) Muroran, Hokkaido, Japan
- Height: 161 cm (5 ft 3 in)
- Weight: 61 kg (134 lb; 9 st 8 lb)
- Position: Goaltender
- Caught: Left
- National team: Japan
- Playing career: 1997–2005

Yuka Oda (小田 由香, Oda Yuka; born 15 March 1973) is a retired Japanese ice hockey goaltender. She competed in the women's tournament at the 1998 Winter Olympics.

== Career statistics ==
Year	Team	Event	Result	GP	W	L	T/OT	MIN	GA	SO	GAA	SV%
1998	Japan	OG	6th	5	0	3	0	225:35	30	0	7.98	0.830
