= Shiho Fujiwara =

Japanese ice hockey player

Personal information
- Nationality: Japanese
- Born: 16 November 1971 (age 53); Hokkaido, Japan

Sport
- Sport: Ice hockey

Shiho Fujiwara (藤原 志保, Fujiwara Shiho, born 16 November 1971) is a Japanese ice hockey player. She competed in the women's tournament at the 1998 Winter Olympics.
