= Tuula Puputti =

Finnish ice hockey goaltender and administrator

- Born: 5 November 1977 (age 48) Kuopio, Finland
- Height: 162 cm (5 ft 4 in)
- Weight: 60 kg (132 lb; 9 st 6 lb)
- Position: Goaltender
- Caught: Left
- Played for: JYP Jyväskylä; Minnesota Duluth Bulldogs; KalPa Kuopio
- National team: Finland
- Playing career: 1992–2003
Medal record
Olympic Games
Bronze medal – third place	1998 Nagano	Ice hockey
World Championship
Bronze medal – third place	2000 Canada
Bronze medal – third place	1999 Finland
Bronze medal – third place	1997 Canada
European Championship
Gold medal – first place	1995 Latvia
Gold medal – first place	1993 Denmark

Tuula Katriina Puputti (born 5 November 1977) is a Finnish ice hockey administrator and retired goaltender. She is the head of hockey operations for PWHL Toronto of the Professional Women's Hockey League (PWHL).

== Playing career ==
As a member of the Finnish national team, Puputti won a bronze medal in the women’s ice hockey tournament at the 1998 Winter Olympics, and three IIHF World Women's Championship bronze medals, in 1997, 1999, and 2000. She also competed at the 2002 Winter Olympics and 2001 IIHF Women's World Championship.

== Executive career ==
Puputti served as general manager of the Finnish women's national ice hockey team and women's national under-18 ice hockey team, and as Developer of Girls' Hockey (Finnish: Tyttökiekon kehittäjä) for the Finnish Ice Hockey Association during 2013 to 2023.

== Career statistics ==
=== International ===
Year	Team	Event	Result	GP	W	L	T/OT	MIN	GA	SO	GAA	SV%
1998	Finland	OG	3rd place, bronze medalist(s)	5	3	1	0	270:42	7	1	1.55	0.896
2002	Finland	OG	4th	5	2	3	0	299:22	16	1	3.01	0.899
