= Tiia Reima =

Finnish ice hockey player and coach

- Born: 1 February 1973 (age 53) Tampere, Finland
- Height: 1.59 m (5 ft 3 in)
- Weight: 57 kg (126 lb; 9 st 0 lb)
- Position: Forward
- Shot: Left
- Played for: Ilves-Kiekko; Ilves Tampere; SC Lyss; IHK Helsinki; Ladies Team Lugano; Espoo Blues
- Coached for: Espoo Blues; Espoo United
- National team: Finland
- Playing career: c. 1985–2011
- Coaching career: 2011–2017
Medal record
Olympic Games
Bronze medal – third place	1998 Nagano	Ice hockey
World Championship
Bronze medal – third place	1999 Finland
Bronze medal – third place	1997 Canada
Bronze medal – third place	1994 United States
Bronze medal – third place	1992 Finland
Bronze medal – third place	1990 Canada
European Championship
Gold medal – first place	1995 Latvia
Gold medal – first place	1993 Denmark
Gold medal – first place	1991 Czechoslovakia
Gold medal – first place	1989 West Germany
Bronze medal – third place	1996 Russia

Tiia-Riitta Johanna Reima (born 1 February 1973) is a Finnish retired ice hockey player and coach.

== Playing career ==
A trailblazer of women's ice hockey in Finland, her career with the Finnish national ice hockey team began in the mid-1980s, the early days of women's international ice hockey competition, and spanned nearly two decades. During her tenure with the national team, she was one of Finland's most productive and decorated forwards, winning five IIHF World Women's Championship bronze medals, five IIHF European Women Championship medals (four gold and one bronze), and an Olympic bronze in 1998.

Reima's club career spanned 26 seasons and was played in Finland with Ilves-Kiekko, Ilves Tampere, IHK Helsinki, and the Espoo Blues of the Naisten SM-sarja, and in Switzerland with SC Lyss Damen and the Ladies Team Lugano of the Leistungsklasse A (LKA; renamed SWHL A in 2014).

=== Coaching career ===
She served as coach to the Espoo Blues from 2011 to 2013 and as assistant coach during the 2013–14 season, winning the Aurora Borealis Cup in 2013 and 2014. She was assistant coach to Espoo United Naiset during the 2016–17 season, in which they achieved silver in the Finnish Championship.

== Honours and achievements ==
Before the 2010–11 season, the Naisten SM-sarja renamed its annual award recognizing the top goal scorer in the regular season, dubbing it the Tiia Reima Award. The rebranding of the league as Naisten Liiga for the 2017–18 season, did not impact the trophy, which has been awarded in every season since the renaming.

Reima was inducted into the Hockey Hall of Fame Finland in 2015 as Suomen jääkiekkoleijona ('Finnish Ice Hockey Lion') number 230.

== Career statistics ==
=== Regular season and playoffs ===
Note: GP = Games played; G = Goals; A = Assists; Pts = Points; PIM = Penalty minutes;

			Regular season					Playoffs
Season	Team	League	GP	G	A	Pts	PIM	GP	G	A	Pts	PIM
1985-86	Ilves-Kiekko	I-divisioona	14	11	4	15	4	—	—	—	—	—
1986-87	Ilves-Kiekko	I-divisioona	14	23	1	24	10	—	—	—	—	—
1987-88	Ilves-Kiekko	I-divisioona	10	50	8	58	17	—	—	—	—	—
1988-89	Ilves	SM-sarja	14	20	8	28	14	—	—	—	—	—
1989-90	Ilves	SM-sarja	12	13	4	17	8	4	5	0	5	0
1990-91	Ilves	SM-sarja	11	15	4	19	12	4	6	1	7	6
1991-92	Ilves	SM-sarja	14	20	8	28	28	4	3	3	6	2
1992-93	Ilves	SM-sarja	14	18	10	28	20	5	5	4	9	6
1993-94	Ilves	SM-sarja	24	56	29	85	22	5	2	1	3	2
1996-97	Ilves	SM-sarja	14	10	10	20	16	—	—	—	—	—
1997-98	Ilves	SM-sarja	18	19	20	39	34	—	—	—	—	—
1998-99	Ilves	SM-sarja	24	15	18	33	26	3	2	2	4	6
1999-00	Ilves	SM-sarja	14	12	16	28	20	—	—	—	—	—
2000-01	IHK	SM-sarja	24	25	31	56	30	4	3	3	6	6
2001-02	IHK	SM-sarja	22	22	25	47	34	9	7	3	10	2
2002-03	IHK	SM-sarja	19	21	24	45	4	3	2	0	2	0
2003-04	Ladies Team Lugano	LKA		12	21	33		—	—	—	—	—
2004-05	IHK	SM-sarja	10	0	6	6	2	6	4	3	7	2
2005-06	IHK	SM-sarja	18	6	11	17	18	4	0	1	1	4
2006-07	IHK	SM-sarja	13	5	7	12	24	15	19	35	54	14
2007-08	Blues	SM-sarja	25	12	25	37	34	11	4	4	8	10
2008-09	Blues	SM-sarja	14	7	11	18	10	4	1	3	4	2

=== International ===
Note: GP = Games played; G = Goals; A = Assists; Pts = Points; PIM = Penalty minutes;

				Regular season
Year	Team	Event	Result	GP	G	A	Pts	PIM
1989	Finland	EC	1st place, gold medalist(s)	5	9	6	15	4
1990	Finland	WC	3rd place, bronze medalist(s)	5	6	2	8	4
1991	Finland	EC	1st place, gold medalist(s)	5	6	2	8	4
1992	Finland	WC	3rd place, bronze medalist(s)	5	1	5	6	2
1993	Finland	EC	1st place, gold medalist(s)	3	4	3	7	8
1994	Finland	WC	3rd place, bronze medalist(s)	5	7	4	11	6
1995	Finland	EC	1st place, gold medalist(s)	5	7	7	14	6
1996	Finland	EC	3rd place, bronze medalist(s)	5	3	3	6	4
1997	Finland	WC	3rd place, bronze medalist(s)	5	4	5	9	10
1998	Finland	OG	3rd place, bronze medalist(s)	4	2	1	3	6
1999	Finland	WC	3rd place, bronze medalist(s)	5	1	2	3	6
2002	Finland	OG	4th	5	2	1	3	2
2005	Finland	WC	4th	5	0	1	1	4

== See also ==
- Finnish Hockey Hall of Fame
