= Malin Gustafsson =

Swedish footballer and ice hockey player

Personal information
- Date of birth: 24 January 1980 (age 46)
- Place of birth: Skellefteå, Sweden
- Position: Forward

International career
Years	Team	Apps	(Gls)
	Sweden	4	(0)

Malin Gustafsson (born 24 January 1980) is a Swedish women's footballer and ice hockey player. As a footballer, she plays as a forward. She was a member of the Sweden women's national football team. She was part of the team at the 1999 FIFA Women's World Cup. She also competed in the women's ice hockey tournament at the 1998 Winter Olympics.
