= Haruka Watanabe =

Japanese ice hockey player

Haruka Watanabe 渡邉 はる香
- Born: 13 December 1972 (age 53) Tochigi, Japan
- Height: 165 cm (5 ft 5 in)
- Weight: 54 kg (119 lb; 8 st 7 lb)
- Position: Goaltender
- National team: Japan
- Playing career: 1997–1998

Haruka Watanabe (渡邉 はる香, Watanabe Haruka; born 13 December 1972) is a retired Japanese ice hockey goaltender. She competed in the women's tournament at the 1998 Winter Olympics.

== Career statistics ==
Year	Team	Event	Result	GP	W	L	T/OT	MIN	GA	SO	GAA	SV%
1998	Japan	OG	6th	3	0	2	0	74:09	15	0	12.15	0.776
