= Zhang Lan (ice hockey) =

Chinese ice hockey player

- Born: 18 September 1968 (age 57)
- Height: 166 cm (5 ft 5 in)
- Weight: 57 kg (126 lb; 9 st 0 lb)
- Position: Forward
- National team: China
- Playing career: 1996–1999

Zhang Lan (simplified Chinese: 张岚; traditional Chinese: 張嵐; pinyin: Zhāng Lán; born 18 September 1968) is a retired Chinese ice hockey player. She competed in the women's tournament at the 1998 Winter Olympics.

== Career statistics ==
Note: GP = Games played; G = Goals; A = Assists; Pts = Points; PIM = Penalty minutes;

				Regular season
Year	Team	Event	Result	GP	G	A	Pts	PIM
1997	China	WC	4th	5	2	2	4	4
1998	China	OG	4th	6	2	1	3	0
1999	China	WC	5th	5	1	0	1	2
