= Marianne Ihalainen =

Finnish ice hockey player

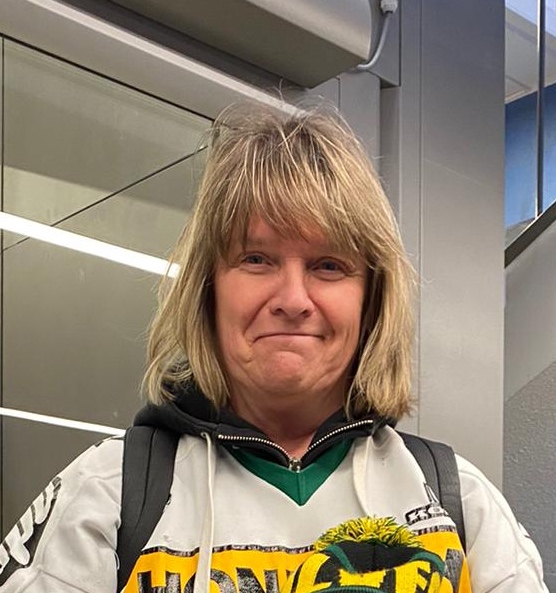
- Born: February 22, 1967 (age 59) Tampere, Finland
- Height: 165 cm (5 ft 5 in)
- Weight: 68 kg (150 lb; 10 st 10 lb)
- Position: Forward
- Shot: Right
- Played for: Tampereen Ilves
- National team: Finland
- Playing career: 1982–2001
Medal record
Women's ice hockey
Representing Finland
Olympic Games
Bronze medal – third place	1998 Nagano	Team
World Championships
Bronze medal – third place	2000 Canada
Bronze medal – third place	1999 Finland
Bronze medal – third place	1997 Canada
Bronze medal – third place	1994 United States
Bronze medal – third place	1992 Finland
Bronze medal – third place	1990 Canada
European Championship
Gold medal – first place	1995 Latvia
Gold medal – first place	1993 Denmark
Gold medal – first place	1991 Czechoslovakia
Gold medal – first place	1989 West Germany
Bronze medal – third place	1996 Russia

Marianne Ihalainen (born 22 February 1967) is a retired Finnish ice hockey forward. She won a bronze medal as captain of the Finnish national team at the 1998 Winter Olympics and also won six IIHF World Women's Championship bronze medals, four IIHF European Women Championships gold medals and one bronze while representing Finland and was eight time SM-sarja Finnish Champion with Ilves. Ihalainen is regarded as one of the pioneers of women’s ice hockey in Finland and she was one of the first women inducted into the Hockey Hall of Fame Finland, alongside fellow trailblazer Riikka Sallinen.

After her retirement from playing in 2001, Ihalainen coached the Ilves women’s team during 2002–2006 and led the team to victory in the 2006 SM-sarja Finnish Championship. In 2006, she became the head coach and team manager of the Finnish national team. Under Ihalainen coaching, the Finnish national team won bronze medals at the 2008 and 2009 IIHF Women's World Championship and a bronze medal at the 2010 Winter Olympics.

At a ceremony held during the 2019 IIHF Women's World Championship in Espoo, she became the first woman to have her career formally honoured by the Finnish Ice Hockey Association.

== Awards and honours ==
Award	Year
Finland
Naisten SM-sarja Top Goal Scorer later renamed the Tiia Reima Award	1989–90 (21 goals)
Naisten SM-sarja Top Point Scorer later renamed the Marianne Ihalainen Award	1989–90 (33 points)
Suomen Jääkiekkoleijona; Hockey Hall of Fame Finland	2007
Number retired by the Tampereen Ilves	2007
Career honoured by the Finnish Ice Hockey Association	13 April 2019
International
IIHF European Women Championship Gold Medal	1989, 1991, 1993, 1995
IIHF Women's World Championship Bronze Medal	1990, 1992, 1994, 1997, 1999, 2000
IIHF European Women Championship Bronze Medal	1996
Olympic Games Bronze Medal	1998

== Career statistics ==
=== Club career ===
Note: GP = Games played; G = Goals; A = Assists; Pts = Points; PIM = Penalty minutes;

			Regular season					Playoffs
Season	Team	League	GP	G	A	Pts	PIM	GP	G	A	Pts	PIM
1982-83	Ilves	SM-sarja	8	11	7	18	0	—	—	—	—	—
1983-84	Ilves	SM-sarja	5	4	4	8	2	3	2	1	3	0
1984-85	Ilves	SM-sarja	8	25	12	37	12	6	7	7	14	0
1985-86	Ilves	SM-sarja	14	13	9	22	6	—	—	—	—	—
1986-87	Ilves	SM-sarja	14	25	14	39	4	—	—	—	—	—
1987-88	Ilves	SM-sarja	14	20	13	33	0	—	—	—	—	—
1988-89	Ilves	SM-sarja	14	19	11	30	8	—	—	—	—	—
1989-90	Ilves	SM-sarja	12	21	12	33	0	4	4	0	4	0
1990-91	Ilves	SM-sarja	12	14	9	23	6	4	6	2	8	2
1991-92	Ilves	SM-sarja	14	9	19	28	4	4	1	3	4	2
1992-93	Ilves	SM-sarja	14	15	10	25	4	5	3	1	4	2
1993-94	Ilves	SM-sarja	24	33	34	67	14	5	3	3	6	0
1994-95	Ilves	SM-sarja	24	23	14	37	8	5	3	1	4	0
1995-96	Ilves	SM-sarja	24	13	19	32	14	—	—	—	—	—
1996-97	Ilves	SM-sarja	24	21	18	39	12	—	—	—	—	—
1997-98	Ilves	SM-sarja	22	24	16	40	18	3	1	1	2	0
1998-99	Ilves	SM-sarja	24	9	13	22	8	3	1	1	2	0
1999-00	Ilves	SM-sarja	26	12	27	39	22	6	5	4	9	2
2000-01	Ilves	SM-sarja	26	9	21	30	10	5	0	1	1	2

=== International ===
Note: GP = Games played; G = Goals; A = Assists; Pts = Points; PIM = Penalty minutes;

				Regular season
Year	Team	Event	Result	GP	G	A	Pts	PIM
1989	Finland	EC	1st place, gold medalist(s)	5	14	6	20	0
1990	Finland	WC	3rd place, bronze medalist(s)	5	4	2	6	2
1991	Finland	EC	1st place, gold medalist(s)	5	12	8	20	2
1992	Finland	WC	3rd place, bronze medalist(s)	5	3	4	7	4
1993	Finland	EC	1st place, gold medalist(s)	3	3	7	10	0
1994	Finland	WC	3rd place, bronze medalist(s)	5	4	2	6	0
1995	Finland	EC	1st place, gold medalist(s)	5	6	5	11	0
1996	Finland	EC	3rd place, bronze medalist(s)	5	1	3	4	0
1997	Finland	WC	3rd place, bronze medalist(s)	5	2	3	5	0
1998	Finland	OG	3rd place, bronze medalist(s)	5	0	0	0	0
2000	Finland	WC	3rd place, bronze medalist(s)	5	2	0	2	0
