= Sandra Dombrowski =

Swiss ice hockey player and referee (born 1967)

- Born: 19 March 1967 (age 58); Interlaken, Switzerland
- Occupations: Ice hockey player; ice hockey official and supervisor
- Awards: IIHF Hall of Fame (2023)
Ice hockey career
- Played for: DHC BOMO
- National team: Switzerland
- Playing career: 1984–1991

Sandra Frey (née Dombrowski; born 19 March 1967) is a Swiss retired ice hockey player and referee. After playing for the Swiss national team, she became the first female referee to work in the men's Swiss League. She later became the first woman to referee a gold-medal game at the IIHF Women's World Championship, doing so in 1992, 1994, and 1997. She retired from on-ice officiating after the 1998 Winter Olympics women's ice hockey tournament, then worked as a referee supervisor for the Swiss Ice Hockey Federation and the International Ice Hockey Federation (IIHF).

In May 2023, she was the first female on-ice official inducted into the IIHF Hall of Fame.

== Early life ==
Dombrowski was born on 19 March 1967 in Interlaken, Bern, Switzerland. Growing up in Interlaken, she played outdoors ice hockey with boys. At the time, girls were not allowed to play on boys' league teams, and no local girls' team existed.

== Playing career ==
At age 17 in 1984, Dombrowski established a local ladies' club; Damen Hockey Club Berner Oberländer Modis, better known as DHC BOMO, based in Matten bei Interlaken. She represented Switzerland at the 1987 World Women's Hockey Tournament hosted in Toronto, an international tournament which predated International Ice Hockey Federation (IIHF) events for women. The Swiss team placed fifth of seven teams at the tournament.

DHC BOMO originally played against female teams from Fribourg, Lausanne, and Kloten. Registration was initially open to any female who could skate, but as popularity of the women's game grew, there was competition to make the team. When the IIHF World Women's Championship were established in 1990, Dombrowski held only a German passport and was ineligible to represent Switzerland. She retired from playing after the 1990–91 season. DHC BOMO merged with DSC Thun in 1992, to become EV BOMO Thun and play in the Swiss Women's League.

== Officiating career ==
Dombrowski became an ice hockey referee in 1983, and became the first woman to officiate men's amateur games in Switzerland. She recalled that during her early games as an official, "My father was among the spectators at one of my games and had to leave after the first period because he couldn't take the comments from the supporters around him". She was later the first female referee in the men's Swiss League, and the first to referee an exhibition game in the men's National League. At the 1990 Men's Ice Hockey World Championships hosted in Switzerland, Dombrowski volunteered to drive the officials to practice each day. When Swiss official Michel Clemençon encouraged her to join the practice, the supervisor of officials Bob Nadin agreed, and assisted her with earning IIHF officiating credentials.

The IIHF World Women's Championship began with mostly male on-ice officials, due to the shortage of female officials. Dombrowski became the first female to referee a Women's World Championship gold-medal game, when she officiated the 1992, 1994, and 1997 gold-medal games. Each of the three gold-medal games were Canada versus the United States.

The 1997 Women's World Championship was the first to use all-female on-ice officials, followed by the same at the women's tournament at the 1998 Winter Olympics. Dombrowski served as both a referee and a linesperson at the 1998 Winter Olympics, but missed the gold-medal game due to illness.

After retiring as a referee in 1998, Dombrowski remained active as a referee supervisor for men's and women's games in the Swiss Ice Hockey Federation and the IIHF. She became the first female member of the IIHF referee committee, when chairman Philippe Lacarrière nominated her. She remained on the committee until retiring from the IIHF in 2006, then continued as a referee supervisor for the Swiss Ice Hockey Federation until 2022. As a supervisor, she advocated for women's leagues to have on-ice officials who showed interest in the women's hockey, since it is different from men's hockey. In 1998, she became the first woman to sit on the IIHF Officiating Committee.

== Honors and awards ==
In December 2022, Dombrowski was announced as the eighth official and first female referee to be inducted into the IIHF Hall of Fame. She is the first official to be so recognized in thirteen years – László Schell, the prior official to be inducted, was honored in 2009. The induction ceremony was during the medal presentation ceremony of the 2023 IIHF World Championship on 28 May 2023 in Tampere, Finland.

== Personal life ==
Dombrowski's father is German, and her mother is Dutch. Her married surname is Frey. In addition to her involvement in ice hockey, she is a civil engineer. As of 2012, she worked in Wattenwil and lived in Blumenstein. She previously worked at the firm Mätzener & Wyss Bauingenieure AG in Interlaken.
