= Lisa Brown-Miller =

American ice hockey player (1966–2025)

- Born: November 16, 1966 Union Lake, Michigan, U.S.
- Died: May 2, 2025 (aged 58)
- Height: 5 ft 1 in (155 cm)
- Weight: 126 lb (57 kg; 9 st 0 lb)
- Position: Forward
- Played for: Providence
- National team: United States
- Playing career: 1984–1998
Medal record
Event	1st	2nd	3rd
Olympic Games	1	0	0
World Championship	0	4	0
Total	1	4	0
Women's ice hockey
Representing United States
Olympic Games
Gold medal – first place	1998 Nagano	Team
World Championship
Silver medal – second place	1990 Canada	Team
Silver medal – second place	1992 Finland	Team
Silver medal – second place	1994 United States	Team
Silver medal – second place	1997 Canada	Team

Elizabeth (Lisa) Brown-Miller (November 16, 1966 – May 2, 2025) was an American ice hockey player. She won a gold medal at the 1998 Winter Olympics.

== Playing career ==
Brown-Miller graduated from West Bloomfield High School, where she participated in ice hockey, basketball, and softball. She enjoyed mountain biking, running, and water skiing.

=== Providence Friars ===
Brown-Miller played four years of hockey for the Providence Friars women's ice hockey program and graduated in 1988 with a degree in humanities. She earned All-Eastern College Athletic Conference accolades as a sophomore, junior and senior. In addition, she was named the ECAC Player of the Year and American Women's Hockey Coaches' Association Player of the Year following her senior campaign. She finished her career with 154 career points on 92 goals and 62 assists. She also played one year of softball at Providence College.

=== USA Hockey ===
A member of the United States Women's National Team since its inception, Brown-Miller was one of just three players to have appeared on six teams (1990, 1992, 1994, 1995, 1996, and 1997). In 30 games with the national team, she recorded 13 goals and 25 assists. In addition, she also appeared on the United States Women's Select Teams in 1993, 1995, 1996, and 1997.

== Coaching ==
Brown-Miller served as the head coach of the Princeton University women's ice hockey team from 1991 to 1996. During those years, her teams compiled a 60–45–5 overall record. In 1994–95, the Tigers finished the season as Ivy League Co-Champions. In 1991–92, her first season at the helm of the program, Brown-Miller guided the Tigers to the Ivy League Championship and earned Eastern College Athletic Conference Coach of the Year honors. She resigned in 1996 to train full-time with the United States Women's program. In 2019, she accepted the position of head coach at Aquinas College in Grand Rapids, Michigan.

== Personal life and death ==
Brown-Miller resided in Holland, Michigan, with her wife Peggy. They had three children. She coached with the Griffins Youth Foundation in Grand Rapids.

Brown-Miller died by suicide on May 2, 2025, at the age of 58. Her family donated her brain to the Boston University CTE Center and Brain Bank, to be used in their research on chronic traumatic encephalopathy.

== Career statistics ==
=== International ===
Year	Team	Event	Result	GP	G	A	Pts	PIM
1990	USA	WC	2nd place, silver medalist(s)	5	-	-	-	-

=== Coaching record ===
Season	Wins	Losses	Ties	Ivy Lg. record	ECAC record
1991–92	11	8	1	7–2–1	
1992–93	8	8	2	6–3–1	
1993–94	15	7	1	8–2–0	7–4–0
1994–95	17	6	1	8–2–0	11–3–0
1995–96	9	17	0	3–7–0	8–8–0
Total	60	46	5	32–16–2	26–15

== Awards and honors ==
- Named the Most Valuable Player of the 1992 United States Women's National Team after scoring nine points in five games
