= Charlotte Göthesson =

Swedish ice hockey player

- Born: 6 April 1974 (age 51) Krokek, Sweden
- Height: 160 cm (5 ft 3 in)
- Weight: 68 kg (150 lb; 10 st 10 lb)
- Position: Goaltender
- Caught: Left
- National team: Sweden
- Playing career: 1993–2006

Charlotte Göthesson (born 6 April 1974) is a retired Swedish ice hockey goaltender. She competed in the women's tournament at the 1998 Winter Olympics.

== Career statistics ==
Year	Team	Event	Result	GP	W	L	T/OT	MIN	GA	SO	GAA	SV%
1998	Sweden	OG	5th	2	1	1	0	120:00	5	1	2.50	0.906
