= Danielle Dube =

Canadian ice hockey player

- Born: March 10, 1976 (age 50) Vancouver, British Columbia, Canada
- Height: 5 ft 8 in (173 cm)
- Weight: 160 lb (73 kg; 11 st 6 lb)
- Position: Goaltender
- Caught: Left
- WCHL Canada West team: Long Beach Ice Dogs; UBC Thunderbirds
- National team: Canada
- Playing career: 1994–2016
Medal record
Representing Canada
Women's ice hockey
IIHF World Women's Championships
| Gold medal – first place | 1997 Canada | Tournament |

Danielle Dube (born March 10, 1976) played for the Canadian National women's ice hockey team from 1994 to 1998 and from 2000 to 2002. She was a late cut from the 1998 and 2002 Canadian Olympic teams.

On December 11, 2002, Danielle Dube became the third female goaltender to start in goal for a professional men's team. Dube was the goalie for the Long Beach Ice Dogs in a loss against the San Diego Gulls. She stopped 12 of 13 shots for the Ice Dogs. In 2008, she had considered approaching the Vancouver Canucks, with hopes of earning a recommendation to play for the ECHL's Victoria Salmon Kings.

On August 26, 2011, she participated in the Longest Ice Hockey Game 4 CF, at Canlan Ice Sports Burnaby 8 Rinks in Burnaby, British Columbia. The goal was to play for the next 10 days as 40 women attempted to set a new Guinness World Record for playing the longest hockey game while also raising funds and awareness for the Canadian Cystic Fibrosis Foundation.

Dube studied at the faculty of Arts at the University of British Columbia. She joined the UBC Thunderbirds women's ice hockey program as a player at the beginning of the 2012-13 Canada West season and helped the team to the greatest turnaround in Canadian Interuniversity Sport history.

== Awards and honours ==
- British Columbia Female Athlete of the Year, 1996
- UBC Thunderbirds Player of the Game, 2016 USports National Championship Quarterfinals
- 2015-16 May Brown Trophy - University of British Columbia Graduating Female Athlete of the Year

== Personal ==
Danielle lives with her two children, son Porter and daughter Camden. When she was eight and a half weeks pregnant with Porter, she played in a Sea-to-Sky Challenge game.
