= Sari Marjamäki =

Finnish ice hockey player

- Born: 17 December 1971 (age 54) Pori, Finland
- Height: 164 cm (5 ft 5 in)
- Weight: 65 kg (143 lb; 10 st 3 lb)
- Position: Forward
- Shot: Left
- Played for: Porin Ässät; Tampereen Ilves; Espoo Blues; Porin Kärpät
- National team: Finland
- Playing career: 1984–2009
Medal record
Olympic Games
Bronze medal – third place	1998 Nagano	Team
World Championship
Bronze medal – third place	2004 Canada
Bronze medal – third place	2000 Canada
Bronze medal – third place	1999 Finland
Bronze medal – third place	1997 Canada
Bronze medal – third place	1994 United States
Bronze medal – third place	1992 Finland
European Championship
Gold medal – first place	1995 Latvia
Gold medal – first place	1993 Denmark
Gold medal – first place	1991 Czechoslovakia
Gold medal – first place	1989 West Germany
Bronze medal – third place	1996 Russia

Sari Kristiina Marjamäki née Fisk (born 17 December 1971) is a Finnish retired ice hockey forward. She played 217 matches as a member of the Finnish national team and represented Finland at sixteen top-level international competitions: three Olympic women's ice hockey tournaments, eight World Championships, and five European Championships. She won an Olympic bronze medal in the inaugural women's ice hockey tournament at the 1998 Winter Olympics, six World Championship bronze medals, four European Championship gold medals, and one European Championship bronze medal.

== Playing career ==
Marjamäki's career in the Naisten SM-sarja (NSMs; renamed Naisten Liiga in 2017) spanned 23 seasons and was played with Porin Ässät, Tampereen Ilves, and the Espoo Blues. She amassed four Finnish Championship (SM) gold medals, two SM silver medals, and four SM bronze medals. Across her 23 seasons in the league, Marjamäki scored 339 goals and tallied 253 assists for 592 points in 401 regular season games. As of 2024, she holds sole possession of seventh on the league's all-time regular season points totals.

== Personal life ==
She and her husband, ice hockey coach Lauri Marjamäki, have two children.

== Career statistics ==
=== Regular season and postseason ===
Bold indicates led league

			Regular season					Postseason
Season	Team	League	GP	G	A	Pts	PIM	GP	G	A	Pts	PIM
1984–85	Porin Ässät	NSMs	6	2	0	2	0	—	—	—	—	—
1985–86	Porin Ässät	NSMs	14	6	1	7	6	—	—	—	—	—
1986–87	Porin Ässät	NSMs	13	5	13	18	4	—	—	—	—	—
1987–88	Porin Ässät	NSMs	14	13	2	15	10	—	—	—	—	—
1988–89	Porin Ässät	NSMs	14	11	9	20	8	—	—	—	—	—
1989–90	Porin Ässät	NSMs	6	2	1	3	0	—	—	—	—	—
1990–91	Porin Ässät	NSMs	12	9	10	19	4	3	1	1	2	2
1991–92	Porin Ässät	NSMs	14	12	5	17	10	—	—	—	—	—
1992–93	Porin Ässät	NSMs	14	**22**	6	28	10	—	—	—	—	—
1993–94	Ilves Tampere	NSMs	24	34	31	65	2	5	4	3	7	2
1994–95	Ilves Tampere	NSMs	24	**32**	26	**58**	6	5	2	3	5	0
1995–96	Ilves Tampere	NSMs	24	17	17	34	10	—	—	—	—	—
1996–97	Ilves Tampere	NSMs	23	15	12	27	10	—	—	—	—	—
1997–98	Ilves Tampere	NSMs	23	17	17	34	12	3	0	0	0	0
1998–99	Ilves Tampere	NSMs	24	19	12	31	12	3	2	0	2	0
1999–00	Ilves Tampere	NSMs	9	5	8	13	4	6	2	5	7	2
2000–01	Ilves Tampere	NSMs	26	**28**	16	44	12	5	3	2	5	4
2001–02	Ilves Tampere	NSMs	19	13	5	18	2	8	3	6	9	6
2002–03	Espoo Blues	NSMs	24	23	18	41	12	7	5	3	8	2
2003–04	Espoo Blues	NSMs	24	22	15	37	12	7	6	4	10	2
2004–05	Espoo Blues	NSMs	20	11	13	24	2	5	0	2	2	4
2005–06	Espoo Blues	NSMs	20	17	13	30	6	6	1	3	4	4
2006–07	Espoo Blues	NSMs	10	4	3	7	4	7	3	0	3	0
2007–08	Did not play
2008–09	Porin Kärpät	I-divisioona	—	—	—	—	—	4	1	3	4	0
Naisten SM-sarja totals			401	339	253	592	158	70	32	32	64	30

=== International ===
Note: GP = Games played; G = Goals; A = Assists; Pts = Points; PIM = Penalty minutes;

				Regular season
Year	Team	Event	Result	GP	G	A	Pts	PIM
1989	Finland	EC	1st place, gold medalist(s)	5	2	3	5	0
1991	Finland	EC	1st place, gold medalist(s)	5	10	2	12	0
1992	Finland	WC	3rd place, bronze medalist(s)	5	2	0	2	0
1993	Finland	EC	1st place, gold medalist(s)	3	2	2	4	2
1994	Finland	WC	3rd place, bronze medalist(s)	5	1	1	2	0
1995	Finland	EC	1st place, gold medalist(s)	5	6	3	9	2
1996	Finland	EC	3rd place, bronze medalist(s)	5	2	1	3	0
1997	Finland	WC	3rd place, bronze medalist(s)	5	0	0	0	0
1998	Finland	OG	3rd place, bronze medalist(s)	6	2	4	6	4
1999	Finland	WC	3rd place, bronze medalist(s)	5	4	5	9	0
2000	Finland	WC	3rd place, bronze medalist(s)	5	1	2	3	2
2001	Finland	WC	4th	5	0	2	2	4
2002	Finland	OG	4th	5	0	3	3	0
2004	Finland	WC	3rd place, bronze medalist(s)	5	1	3	4	4
2005	Finland	WC	4th	5	0	0	0	2
2006	Finland	OG	4th	5	0	0	0	4

== Awards and honors ==
Since her retirement in 2009, Marjamäki has received numerous awards and honors in recognition of her accomplishments and positive influence on women's ice hockey in Finland. In 2014, she was inducted into the Hockey Hall of Fame Finland, becoming Suomen Jääkiekkoleijona #223 ('Finnish Ice Hockey Lion #223'). She was honored as an Ilves Hockey Legend at a ceremony held on 7 March 2020.

=== Awards ===
Award	Year
Naisten SM-sarja / Naisten Liiga
Champion	2003, 2004, 2005, 2007
Most goals	1993, 1995, 2001
Most points	1995
Best plus/minus	1998

=== Other achievements ===
- 3rd in Naisten Liiga all-time regular season goals (as of 18 January 2023)
- 6th in Naisten Liiga regular season games played (as of 18 January 2023)
- 1st in Ässät all-time regular season points, goals, assists and games played (as of 18 January 2023)
- Named an Ilves Hockey Legend
