= Maria Saarni =

Finnish ice hockey player

- Born: 8 September 1977 (age 49) Helsinki, Finland
- Height: 162 cm (5 ft 4 in)
- Weight: 52 kg (115 lb; 8 st 3 lb)
- Position: Forward
- Shot: Left
- Played for: Kiekko-Espoo; Espoo Blues; JyHC Jyväskylä; LoKV Lohja
- National team: Finland
- Playing career: 1994–2017
Medal record
Olympic Games
Bronze medal – third place	1998 Nagano	Ice hockey
World Championship
Bronze medal – third place	2000 Canada
Bronze medal – third place	1999 Finland
European Championship
Bronze medal – third place	1996 Russia

Maria Helena Saarni née Selin (born 8 September 1977) is a Finnish retired ice hockey player. She was a member of the Finnish women's national ice hockey team throughout the 1990s and won a bronze medal at the inaugural Olympic women's ice hockey tournament at the 1998 Winter Olympics. With the national team, she also won bronze at the IIHF Women's World Championship tournaments in 1999 and 2000, and at the 1996 IIHF European Women Championship.

== Career statistics ==
=== Regular season and postseason ===
Note: GP = Games played; G = Goals; A = Assists; Pts = Points; PIM = Penalty minutes;

			Regular season					Playoffs
Season	Team	League	GP	G	A	Pts	PIM	GP	G	A	Pts	PIM
1994-95	Kiekko-Espoo	SM-sarja	20	9	3	12	48	—	—	—	—	—
1995-96	Kiekko-Espoo	SM-sarja	24	12	9	21	48	3	1	0	1	4
1996-97	Kiekko-Espoo	SM-sarja	24	13	7	20	56	4	0	2	2	4
1997-98	Kiekko-Espoo	SM-sarja	23	16	11	27	24	4	0	2	2	2
1998-99	Espoo Blues	SM-sarja	23	14	11	25	40	6	7	3	10	12
1999-00	Espoo Blues	SM-sarja	26	21	11	32	26	6	4	7	11	4
2000-01	JyHC	SM-sarja	9	4	7	11	16	13	6	10	16	14
2009-10	LoKV	SM-sarja	28	5	11	16	40	2	1	2	3	4
2010-11	LoKV	SM-sarja	9	3	0	3	14	15	12	11	23	10
2016-17	HAKI	Mestis Q	12	2	3	5	22	—	—	—	—	—

=== International ===
Note: GP = Games played; G = Goals; A = Assists; Pts = Points; PIM = Penalty minutes;

				Regular season
Year	Team	Event	Result	GP	G	A	Pts	PIM
1996	Finland	EC	3rd place, bronze medalist(s)	5	1	1	2	0
1998	Finland	OG	3rd place, bronze medalist(s)	5	0	1	1	2
1999	Finland	WC	3rd place, bronze medalist(s)	5	0	1	1	2
2000	Finland	WC	3rd place, bronze medalist(s)	5	0	0	0	2

== See also ==
- List of Olympic women's ice hockey players for Finland
