= Katja Riipi =

Finnish ice hockey player

- Born: 26 October 1975 (age 50) Sodankylä, Lapland, Finland
- Height: 159 cm (5 ft 3 in)
- Weight: 65 kg (143 lb; 10 st 3 lb)
- Position: Forward
- Shot: Left
- Played for: Kärpät Oulu; Ilves Tampere; IHK Helsinki; HPK Hämmenlinna
- National team: Finland
- Playing career: c. 1994–2011
Medal record
Olympic Games
Bronze medal – third place	1998 Nagano	Ice hockey
World Championship
Bronze medal – third place	2004 Canada
Bronze medal – third place	2000 Canada
Bronze medal – third place	1999 Finland
Bronze medal – third place	1997 Canada
European Championship
Bronze medal – third place	1996 Russia

Katja Hannele Riipi (born 26 October 1975) is a Finnish retired ice hockey player and former member of the Finnish national ice hockey team. She won an Olympic bronze medal representing Finland in the women's ice hockey tournament at the 1998 Winter Olympics. A seven-time competitor in the IIHF Women's World Championship, she won bronze medals at the tournaments in 1997, 1999, 2000, and 2004. She also participated in the 1996 IIHF European Women Championships, winning bronze with Finland.

Riipi was born in Sodankylä.
