= Sarah Tueting =

American ice hockey player (born 1976)

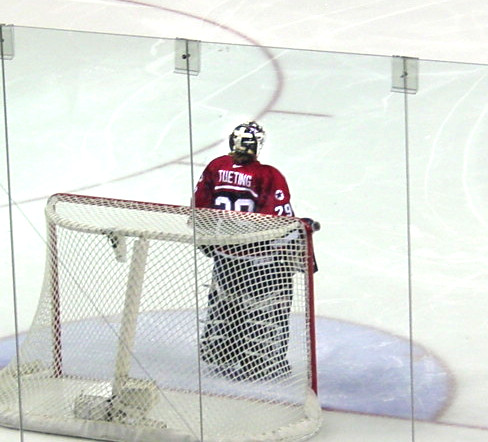
- Born: April 26, 1976 (age 50) New York City, U.S.
- Height: 5 ft 7 in (170 cm)
- Weight: 139 lb (63 kg; 9 st 13 lb)
- Position: Goaltender
- Caught: Left
- ECAC team: Dartmouth
- National team: United States
- Playing career: 1994–2002
Medal record
Representing United States
Women's ice hockey
Olympic Games
Gold medal – first place	1998 Nagano	Tournament
Silver medal – second place	2002 Salt Lake City	Tournament
IIHF World Women's Championships
Silver medal – second place	1997 Canada	Tournament
Silver medal – second place	2000 Canada	Tournament
Silver medal – second place	2001 United States	Tournament

Sarah Kirsten Tueting (born April 26, 1976) is an American ice hockey player.

Tueting played goalie for the United States women's national ice hockey team. She and her team won a gold medal at the 1998 Winter Olympics, and a silver medal at the 2002 Winter Olympics.

== Personal life ==
Tueting grew up in Winnetka, Illinois, a northern suburb of Chicago, and attended Greeley Elementary School. She graduated from Dartmouth College magna cum laude with a degree in neuroscience, and the Stanford Graduate School of Business in 2005 with an MBA. After graduating, Tueting worked at Medtronic before founding her own business.

Tueting is a life/executive coach. She lives in Park City, Utah with her two kids, three cats, one dog, and two horses.

== Career statistics ==
Year	Team	Event	Result	GP	W	L	T/OT	MIN	GA	SO	GAA	SV%
1998	USA	OG	1st place, gold medalist(s)	4	3	0	0	209:21	4	1	1.15	0.938
2002	USA	OG	2nd place, silver medalist(s)	2	2	0	0	120:00	1	1	0.50	0.950
