= Liisa-Maria Sneck =

Finnish ice hockey player

- Born: 10 November 1968 (age 57) Helsinki, Finland
- Height: 167 cm (5 ft 6 in)
- Weight: 74 kg (163 lb; 11 st 9 lb)
- Position: Goaltender
- Caught: Left
- Played for: Keravan Shakers; Tampereen Ilves; HIFK Naiset
- National team: Finland
- Playing career: 1988–1998
Medal record
Women's ice hockey
Representing Finland
Olympic Games
Bronze medal – third place	1998 Nagano	Ice hockey
World Championship
Bronze medal – third place	1997 Canada
Bronze medal – third place	1994 United States
Bronze medal – third place	1992 Finland
Bronze medal – third place	1990 Canada
European Championship
Gold medal – first place	1993 Denmark
Gold medal – first place	1991 Czechoslovakia
Gold medal – first place	1989 West Germany

Liisa-Maria Sneck (born 10 November 1968) is a Finnish retired ice hockey goaltender. She played with the Finnish national ice hockey team during 1988 to 1998 and won three IIHF European Women Championship gold medals, four IIHF Women's World Championship bronze medals, and a bronze medal at the inaugural Olympic women's ice hockey tournament at the 1998 Winter Olympics.

Her club career was played in the Naisten SM-sarja during 1984 to 1998 with HIFK Naiset, the Tampereen Ilves Naiset, and the Keravan Shakers. Following her retirement from elite play, Sneck served as goaltending coach to Itä-Helsingin Kiekko (IHK) Naiset in the Naisten SM-sarja for several years.

== Career statistics ==
=== Regular season and playoffs ===
			Regular season									Playoffs
Season	Team	League	GP	W	L	OT	MIN	GA	SO	GAA	SV%	GP	W	L	OT	MIN	GA	SO	GAA	SV%
1984-85	HIFK Naiset	SM-sarja	-	-	-	-	-	-	-	-	-	-	-	-	-	-	-	-	-	-
1985-86	HIFK Naiset	SM-sarja	-	-	-	-	-	-	-	-	-	-	-	-	-	-	-	-	-	-
1986-87	HIFK Naiset	SM-sarja	-	-	-	-	-	-	-	-	-	-	-	-	-	-	-	-	-	-
1987-88	HIFK Naiset	SM-sarja	-	-	-	-	-	-	-	-	-	-	-	-	-	-	-	-	-	-
1988-89	HIFK Naiset	SM-sarja	-	-	-	-	-	-	-	-	-	-	-	-	-	-	-	-	-	-
1989-90	Ilves Naiset	SM-sarja	-	-	-	-	-	-	-	-	-	-	-	-	-	-	-	-	-	-
1990-91	Ilves Naiset	SM-sarja	-	-	-	-	-	-	-	-	-	-	-	-	-	-	-	-	-	-
1991-92	Ilves Naiset	SM-sarja	-	-	-	-	-	-	-	-	-	-	-	-	-	-	-	-	-	-
1992-93	Ilves Naiset	SM-sarja	-	-	-	-	-	-	-	-	-	-	-	-	-	-	-	-	-	-
1993-94	Ilves Naiset	SM-sarja	-	-	-	-	-	-	-	-	-	-	-	-	-	-	-	-	-	-
1995-96	Shakers Kerava	SM-sarja	-	-	-	-	-	-	-	-	-	-	-	-	-	-	-	-	-	-
1996-97	Shakers Kerava	SM-sarja	17	-	-	-	-	-	-	-	0.903	6	-	-	-	-	-	-	-	0.912
1997-98	Shakers Kerava	SM-sarja	13	-	-	-	-	-	-	3.73	0.885	-	-	-	-	-	-	-	-	-

=== International ===
Year	Team	Event	Result	GP	W	L	T/OT	MIN	GA	SO	GAA	SV%
1989	Finland	EC	1st place, gold medalist(s)	3	-	-	-	-	-	0.67	-
1990	Finland	WC	3rd place, bronze medalist(s)	4	-	-	-	240:00	15	-	3.75	0.832
1992	Finland	WC	3rd place, bronze medalist(s)	3	-	-	-	157:00	14	-	5.35	0.771
1994	Finland	WC	3rd place, bronze medalist(s)	4	-	-	-	220:00	7	-	1.41	0.918
1997	Finland	WC	3rd place, bronze medalist(s)	3	-	-	-	-	0	-	0.00	1.000
1998	Finland	OG	3rd place, bronze medalist(s)	2	1	1	0	88:53	4	0	2.70	0.800
