= Linda Leppänen =

Finnish ice hockey player & coach

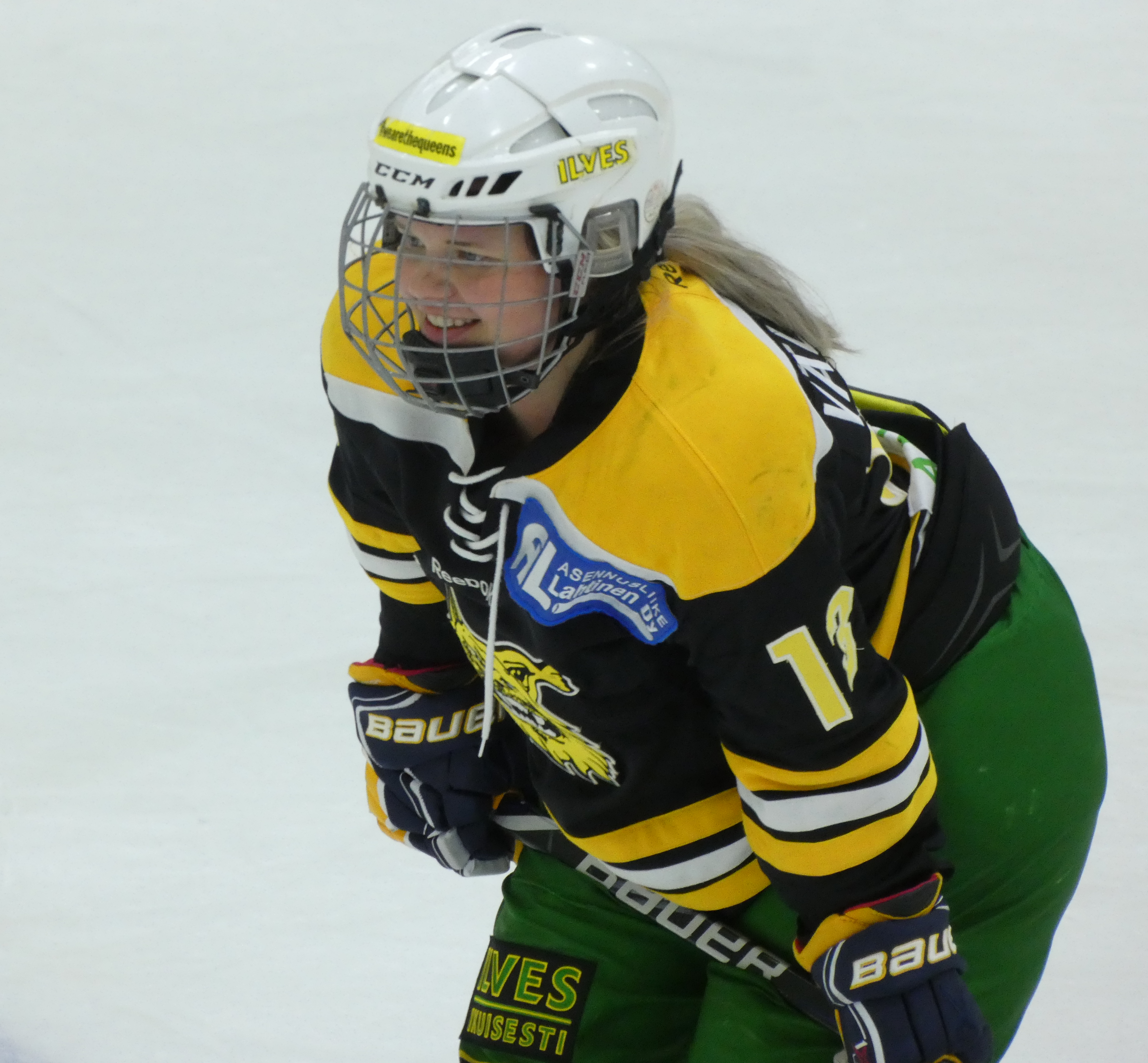
- Leppänen playing in an Ilves exhibition match in December 2022
- Born: 31 May 1990 (age 36) Ylöjärvi, Finland
- Height: 1.66 m (5 ft 5 in)
- Weight: 69 kg (152 lb; 10 st 12 lb)
- Position: Forward
- Shot: Left
- Played for: Ylöjärven Ilves; Espoo Blues; Espoo United; Tampereen Ilves
- Coached for: Tampereen Ilves
- National team: Finland
- Playing career: 2002–2019
- Coaching career: 2020–2022
Medal record
Olympic Games
Bronze medal – third place	2010 Vancouver	Ice hockey
Bronze medal – third place	2018 Pyeongchang	Ice hockey
World Championship
Silver medal – second place	2019 Finland
Bronze medal – third place	2015 Sweden
Bronze medal – third place	2017 United States

Linda Leppänen née Välimäki (born 31 May 1990) is a Finnish retired ice hockey forward and coach. Representing Finland, she won bronze medals at the Winter Olympic Games in 2010 and 2018 and at the IIHF Women's World Championships in 2015 and 2017, and a silver medal at the 2019 IIHF Women's World Championship. In total, she played 167 matches with the Finnish national team. Leppänen announced her retirement from top athletic competition several months after achieving her career highlight world championship silver medal.

Leppänen served as head coach of Ilves Tampere in the Naisten Liiga (NSML) during the 2020–21 and 2021–21 seasons. She resigned from the position in April 2022, motivated by a desire to spend more time with her three young children.

== Career statistics ==
Event	Goals	Assists	Points	Shots	PIM	+/-
2010 Winter Olympics	0	1	1	9	12	−2
