= Sandra Whyte-Sweeney =

American ice hockey player (born 1970)

- Born: August 24, 1970 (age 56) Saugus, Massachusetts, U.S.
- Height: 5 ft 7 in (170 cm)
- Weight: 130 lb (59 kg; 9 st 4 lb)
- Position: Forward
- ECAC team: Harvard
- National team: United States
- Playing career: 1989–1998
Medal record
Women's ice hockey
Representing the United States
Olympic Games
Gold medal – first place	1998 Nagano	Team competition
World Championships
Silver medal – second place	1992 Tampere	Team competition
Silver medal – second place	1994 Lake Placid	Team competition
Silver medal – second place	1997 Kitchener	Team competition

Sandra Whyte-Sweeney (born August 24, 1970) is an American ice hockey player.

She won a gold medal at the 1998 Winter Olympics in Nagano, Japan. In the gold medal game, Whyte assisted on her team's first two goals and scored an empty-net goal to seal the United States' 3-1 win over Canada. It was the first gold medal awarded in women's ice hockey in Olympic history.

== Career ==
Whyte-Sweeney has stayed connected to the Olympic movement. She participated in the United States Olympic Committee's Summit program. These are a series of conferences that unite former Olympic gold medalists with medal hopefuls for the next Games with the goal of helping them mentally prepare for the challenge.
