= Johanna Ikonen =

Finnish ice hockey player and coach

- Born: 9 January 1969 (age 57) Eno, Finland
- Height: 163 cm (5 ft 4 in)
- Weight: 61 kg (134 lb; 9 st 8 lb)
- Position: Defense
- Shot: Right
- Played for: HIFK Helsinki; JoKP Joensuu; Shakers Kerava; Kiekko-Espoo; IHK Helsinki
- Current DFEL coach: ESC Planegg-Würmtal
- Coached for: Espoo Blues; IHK Helsinki; OSC Eisladies Berlin; DEC Salzburg Eagles; Austria U18; SDE Hockey
- National team: Finland
- Playing career: c. 1988–1998
- Coaching career: 1998–present
Medal record
Olympic Games
Bronze medal – third place	1998 Nagano	Ice hockey

Johanna Annikki Ikonen (born 9 January 1969) is a Finnish ice hockey coach and former defenceman, currently serving as head coach of ESC Planegg-Würmtal in the German Women's Ice Hockey League (DFEL). She represented Finland in the women's ice hockey tournament at the 1998 Winter Olympics for Finland, and won a bronze medal. Ikonen was born in Eno.

== Career statistics ==
=== Regular season and playoffs ===
Note: GP = Games played; G = Goals; A = Assists; Pts = Points; PIM = Penalty minutes;

			Regular season					Playoffs
Season	Team	League	GP	G	A	Pts	PIM	GP	G	A	Pts	PIM
1988-89	HIFK	SM-sarja	14	13	3	16	10	—	—	—	—	—
1989-90	Shakers Kerava	SM-sarja	12	10	6	16	6	3	1	0	1	2
1990-91	Shakers Kerava	SM-sarja	12	20	8	28	6	4	4	0	4	4
1991-92	Shakers Kerava	SM-sarja	14	16	12	28	2	5	2	1	3	2
1992-93	JoKP	SM-sarja	14	22	8	30	18	3	2	0	2	2
1993-94	Shakers Kerava	SM-sarja	24	31	39	70	8	5	4	6	10	6
1994-95	Shakers Kerava	SM-sarja	23	26	23	49	14	6	2	6	8	4
1995-96	Shakers Kerava	SM-sarja	22	14	15	29	24	7	3	2	5	8
1996-97	Kiekko-Espoo	SM-sarja	24	16	9	25	6	4	4	0	4	4
1997-98	Kiekko-Espoo	SM-sarja	23	10	12	22	8	4	1	1	2	0
2000-01	IHK	SM-sarja	2	1	1	2	0	2	1	1	2	0

=== International ===
Note: GP = Games played; G = Goals; A = Assists; Pts = Points; PIM = Penalty minutes;

				Regular season
Year	Team	Event	Result	GP	G	A	Pts	PIM
1989	Finland	EC	1st place, gold medalist(s)	5	8	6	14	2
1990	Finland	WC	3rd place, bronze medalist(s)	5	2	2	4	2
1991	Finland	EC	1st place, gold medalist(s)	5	8	6	14	0
1992	Finland	WC	3rd place, bronze medalist(s)	5	4	1	5	2
1993	Finland	EC	1st place, gold medalist(s)	3	0	0	0	0
1994	Finland	WC	3rd place, bronze medalist(s)	5	2	4	6	2
1996	Finland	EC	3rd place, bronze medalist(s)	5	0	2	2	2
1997	Finland	WC	3rd place, bronze medalist(s)	5	1	0	1	4
1998	Finland	OG	3rd place, bronze medalist(s)	6	4	1	5	6
