= Fiona Smith-Bell =

Canadian ice hockey player (born 1973)

- Born: October 31, 1973 (age 53) Saskatoon, Saskatchewan, Canada
- Height: 5 ft 2 in (157 cm)
- Weight: 123 lb (56 kg; 8 st 11 lb)
- Position: Defence
- Shot: Left
- National team: Canada
- Playing career: 1996–1999
Medal record
Women's ice hockey
Representing Canada
Olympic Games
Silver medal – second place	1998 Nagano	Tournament
IIHF World Women's Championships
Gold medal – first place	1997 Canada	Tournament
Gold medal – first place	1999 Finland	Tournament

Fiona Lesley Smith (born October 31, 1973, in Saskatoon, Saskatchewan, and raised in Edam, Saskatchewan) is a retired Canadian ice hockey defender. She played for the Edmonton Chimos and the Canadian national team. In 1998 she helped Team Canada win the silver medal at the Olympic Winter Games in Nagano.

== Career ==
Smith was originally a figure skater, as there were no opportunities for girls to play hockey. She captained the boys youth hockey team in North Battleford before joining the first Saskatchewan women's hockey team to compete at the Canada Winter Games at the age of 14.

In 1999, she was nominated for the Saskatchewan Female Athlete of the Year award. In 2002, she would retire from international hockey. She was one of the torch bearers for the 2010 Winter Olympics in Vancouver. In 2012, she was named to the Saskatchewan Sports Hall of Fame.

== Post-playing Career ==
As part of the IIHF Ambassador and Mentor Program, Smith was a Hockey Canada athlete ambassador that travelled to Bratislava, Slovakia to participate in the 2011 IIHF High Performance Women's Camp from July 4–12. She would then work with the German national women's hockey team for two and a half years as an IIHF ambassador.

== Career statistics ==
=== Regular season and playoffs ===
			Regular season					Playoffs
Season	Team	League	GP	G	A	Pts	PIM	GP	G	A	Pts	PIM
2000-01	Edmonton Chimos	NWHL	—	—	—	—	—	—	—	—	—	—

=== International ===
Year	Team	Event	Result	GP	G	A	Pts	PIM
1997	Canada	WC	1st place, gold medalist(s)	5	0	2	2	6
1998	Canada	OG	2nd place, silver medalist(s)	5	1	1	2	2
1999	Canada	WC	1st place, gold medalist(s)	2	0	1	1	0
