= Gretchen Ulion =

American ice hockey player

- Born: May 4, 1972 (age 54) Marlborough, Connecticut, U.S.
- Height: 5 ft 2 in (157 cm)
- Weight: 130 lb (59 kg; 9 st 4 lb)
- Position: Forward
- ECAC team: Dartmouth
- National team: United States
- Playing career: 1990–1998
Medal record
Women's ice hockey
Representing the United States
Olympic Games
Gold medal – first place	1998 Nagano	Team competition
World Championships
Silver medal – second place	1994 United States	Team competition
Silver medal – second place	1997 Canada	Team competition

Gretchen A. Ulion Silverman (born May 4, 1972) is an American ice hockey player. She won a gold medal at the 1998 Winter Olympics. At Dartmouth College, she was and is still today the Dartmouth Big Green women's ice hockey program's all-time leading scorer with 189 goals and 312 points, served as the captain of the Dartmouth Big Green during the 1993–94 season, and was twice the Ivy League Player of the Year.

In the gold medal game at the 1998 Winter Olympics, Ulion scored the first goal of the game. It was also the first ever goal scored in an Olympic women's ice hockey gold medal game. Ulion was featured on the Wheaties box in 1998.

Along with the rest of the 1998 gold medal-winning team, Ulion was admitted to the U.S. Hockey Hall of Fame in 2009. She also received a Gold Key from the Connecticut Sports Writers’ Alliance on April 29, 2018.

In addition to serving as a U18 instructor and motivational speaker for USA Hockey, Ulion is the head coach of the women's ice hockey team at Post University.

== Personal life ==
In 1990, Ulion graduated from The Loomis Chaffee School, where she played hockey under long-time coach Chuck Vernon.

Ulion married Steven Silverman on July 11, 1998.
