= Sari Krooks =

Finnish ice hockey player

- Born: 2 February 1968 (age 58) Vaasa, Finland
- Height: 1.61 m (5 ft 3 in)
- Weight: 53 kg (117 lb; 8 st 5 lb)
- Position: Forward
- Shot: L
- Played for: Vaasan Sport; Toronto Aeros; York Lions; Tampereen Ilves; Beatrice Aeros; DHC Lyss
- National team: Finland
- Playing career: 1983–2004
Medal record
Women's ice hockey
Representing Finland
Olympic Games
Bronze medal – third place	1998 Nagano	Team
World Championships
Bronze medal – third place	1999 Finland
Bronze medal – third place	1997 Canada
Bronze medal – third place	1994 United States
Bronze medal – third place	1992 Finland
Bronze medal – third place	1990 Canada
European Championships
Gold medal – first place	1995 Latvia
Gold medal – first place	1991 Czechoslovakia
Gold medal – first place	1989 West Germany

Sari Kristiina Krooks (born 2 February 1968 in Vaasa) is a Finnish retired ice hockey player. She played on the women's ice hockey team for Finland at the 1998 Winter Olympics, and won a bronze medal.

== Career statistics ==
=== Regular season and playoffs ===
Note: GP = Games played; G = Goals; A = Assists; Pts = Points; PIM = Penalty minutes;

			Regular season					Playoffs
Season	Team	League	GP	G	A	Pts	PIM	GP	G	A	Pts	PIM
1983-84	Sport	SM-sarja	4	18	3	21	2	—	—	—	—	—
1984-85	Sport	SM-sarja	6	29	3	32	8	—	—	—	—	—
1985-86	Sport	SM-sarja	14	46	7	53	21	—	—	—	—	—
1986-87	Sport	SM-sarja	12	35	10	45	30	—	—	—	—	—
1987-88	Sport	SM-sarja	14	38	7	45	22	—	—	—	—	—
1988-89	Sport	SM-sarja	3	6	0	6	16	—	—	—	—	—
1988-89	Toronto Aeros	COWHL				0		—	—	—	—	—
1989-90	Toronto Aeros	COWHL				0		—	—	—	—	—
1990-91	Toronto Aeros	COWHL				0		—	—	—	—	—
1991-92	Toronto Aeros	COWHL				0		—	—	—	—	—
1993-94	Sport	SM-sarja				0		—	—	—	—	—
1994-95	Toronto Aeros	COWHL				0		—	—	—	—	—
1995-96	North York Aeros	COWHL	14	15	7	22	16	—	—	—	—	—
1996-97	York University	CIAU	10	11	11	22	8	—	—	—	—	—
1996-97	North York Aeros	COWHL	25	24	21	45	16	—	—	—	—	—
1997-98	Ilves	SM-sarja	24	15	15	30	22	3	1	0	1	0
1998-99	Beatrice Aeros	NWHL	22	10	11	21	18	—	—	—	—	—
1999-00	Beatrice Aeros	NWHL	2	2	0	2	0	—	—	—	—	—
2000-01	Sport	Il-divisioona				0		—	—	—	—	—
2003-04	DHC Lyss	LKA		2	1	3		—	—	—	—	—

=== International ===
Note: GP = Games played; G = Goals; A = Assists; Pts = Points; PIM = Penalty minutes;

				Regular season
Year	Team	Event	Result	GP	G	A	Pts	PIM
1989	Finland	EC	1st place, gold medalist(s)	5	9	4	13	0
1990	Finland	WC	3rd place, bronze medalist(s)	5	5	2	7	8
1991	Finland	EC	1st place, gold medalist(s)	3	3	3	6	8
1992	Finland	WC	3rd place, bronze medalist(s)	4	5	2	7	2
1994	Finland	WC	3rd place, bronze medalist(s)	5	3	7	10	0
1995	Finland	EC	1st place, gold medalist(s)	5	6	8	14	2
1997	Finland	WC	3rd place, bronze medalist(s)	5	1	1	2	8
1998	Finland	OG	3rd place, bronze medalist(s)	6	2	2	4	12
1999	Finland	WC	3rd place, bronze medalist(s)	5	2	0	2	12
