= Petra Vaarakallio =

Finnish ice hockey player

- Born: 17 June 1975 (age 51) Helsinki, Finland
- Position: Forward
- Shot: Left
- Played for: Kiekko-Espoo; Espoo Blues
- National team: Finland
- Playing career: 1992–2006
Medal record
Women's ice hockey
Olympic Games
Bronze medal – third place	1998 Nagano	Ice hockey
IIHF World Championships
Bronze medal – third place	2000 Canada
Bronze medal – third place	1999 Finland
Bronze medal – third place	1997 Canada
Bronze medal – third place	1994 United States
IIHF European Championships
Gold medal – first place	1995 Latvia
Gold medal – first place	1993 Denmark
Bronze medal – third place	1996 Russia
Ringette
World Championship
Bronze medal – third place	1992 Finland

Petra Maria Paulina Vaarakallio (born 17 June 1975 in Helsinki) is a Finnish retired ice hockey player and ringette player. She played on the women's ice hockey team for Finland at the 1998 Winter Olympics, and won a bronze medal. Vaarakallio scored the first-ever goal in women's ice hockey at the Olympics.

Vaarakallio won the 1992 World Ringette Championships bronze. She stopped playing ringette after receiving a six-month suspension for kicking an opponent who was lying on the ice.
