= Karoliina Rantamäki =

Finnish ice hockey player

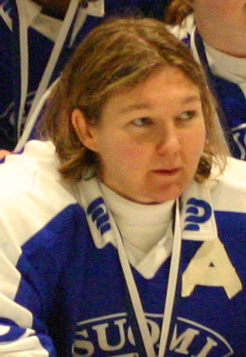
- Rantamäki with the Finnish national team in 2008.
- Born: 23 February 1978 (age 48) Vantaa, Uusimaa, Finland
- Position: Forward
- Shoots: Left
- Auroraliiga team Former teams: Kiekko-Espoo: IFK Helsinki; SKIF Nizhny Novgorod; Espoo Blues
- National team: Finland
- Playing career: 1992–present
Medal record
Olympic Games
Bronze medal – third place	2010 Vancouver	Team
Bronze medal – third place	1998 Nagano	Team
World Championships
Bronze medal – third place	2015 Sweden
Bronze medal – third place	2011 Switzerland
Bronze medal – third place	2009 Finland
Bronze medal – third place	2008 China
Bronze medal – third place	2004 Canada
Bronze medal – third place	2000 Canada
Bronze medal – third place	1999 Finland
Bronze medal – third place	1997 Canada

Karoliina Stina Margaretha Rantamäki (born 23 February 1978) is a Finnish ice hockey player who plays as a forward for Kiekko-Espoo in the Auroraliiga.

Rantamäki holds the record for the most appearances with the Finnish women's national ice hockey team, having competed in 256 elite international games. She represented Finland in five Olympic Games, earning bronze medals in the women's ice hockey tournaments in 1998 and 2010. Additionally, she played in thirteen IIHF Women's World Championships, capturing eight bronze medals in 1997, 1999, 2000, 2004, 2008, 2009, 2011, 2015. At the club level, Rantamäki has been part of championship-winning teams in Finland's Naisten Liiga as well as Russia's Zhenskaya Hockey League (ZhHL) and its predecessor, the Russian Women’s Hockey League.

Starting in the 2010–11 season, the Finnish Ice Hockey Association honored Rantamäki's outstanding contributions to women's hockey by renaming the Most Valuable Player trophy for the Naisten Liiga playoffs in her name. The award, now known as the Karoliina Rantamäki Award, is presented each season to the player deemed most valuable during the league's playoff run.

== Playing career ==
Rantamäki represented Finland at the 2010 Winter Olympics, where she earned her second Olympic bronze medal. That same year, she captured another bronze at the 2010 Four Nations Cup held in St. John's, Newfoundland. At the 2011 IIHF Women's World Championship, she secured the bronze medal for Finland by scoring the winning goal 2:49 into overtime. She also played club hockey for SKIF Nizhny Novgorod.

== Career statistics ==
Event	Goals	Assists	Points	Shots	PIM	+/-
2010 Winter Olympics	2	0	2	6	3	−2
