= Shelley Looney =

American ice hockey player (born 1972)

- Born: January 21, 1972 (age 54) Brownstown Charter Township, Michigan, United States
- Height: 5 ft 5 in (165 cm)
- Weight: 145 lb (66 kg; 10 st 5 lb)
- Position: Forward
- Played for: Northeastern
- National team: United States
- Playing career: 1990–2005
Medal record
Representing United States
Women's ice hockey
Olympic Games
Gold medal – first place	1998 Nagano	Tournament
Silver medal – second place	2002 Salt Lake City	Tournament
IIHF World Women's Championships
Gold medal – first place	2005 Sweden	Tournament
Silver medal – second place	1992 Finland	Tournament
Silver medal – second place	1994 United States	Tournament
Silver medal – second place	1997 Canada	Tournament
Silver medal – second place	1999 Finland	Tournament
Silver medal – second place	2000 Canada	Tournament
Silver medal – second place	2001 United States	Tournament
Silver medal – second place	2004 Canada	Tournament

Shelley Looney (born January 21, 1972, in Brownstown, Michigan, and raised in Trenton, Michigan) is an American ice hockey player and head coach. She scored the game-winning goal in the gold medal game for Team USA at the 1998 Winter Olympics, the team's first gold medal. She won a silver medal at the 2002 Winter Olympics. She played collegiate hockey at Northeastern University from 1991 to 1994, winning multiple awards, including ECAC All-Star, 1993 ECAC Tournament MVP and ECAC Player of the Year (1993–94). She was inducted into Northeastern College's Hockey Hall of Fame in 1999 and the United States Olympic and Paralympic Hall of Fame in 2019.

Looney is formerly the head coach of the Lindenwood University women's ice hockey team, and is the current head coach of the Western Connecticut State University women's ice hockey team, which moves from club to NCAA Division III for the 2026-27 season.

== Playing career ==
In the gold medal game at the 1998 Winter Olympics, Looney scored the game-winning goal. In the fall of 2002, she played with Team USA teammate Cammi Granato for the Vancouver Griffins of the National Women's Hockey League. She finished second on the team and fourth in the Western Conference with 35 points (10–25) in 24 regular-season games. She participated for Team British Columbia at the 2003 Esso Women's Nationals. She was named B.C. Player of the Game in the bronze medal game despite losing to Team Quebec.

While still playing for Team USA, Looney went into coaching, serving as an assistant with the Under-17 Boys' National Team Development Program in 2003, then joining the University of Vermont as assistant coach of the women's team in 2005–06. She left that position to train for the next Olympics.

In 2006, Looney was one of the final players cut from the Olympic team that would go on to win a bronze medal in Turin. She ended her USA Hockey career with 61 goals and 136 points in 151 games.

Looney was the hockey director for the Buffalo Bison Hockey Association until 2019.

Looney was head coach of the NCAA Division 1 Lindenwood University Lady Lions women's ice hockey team for 3 seasons before leaving to become head coach of the NCAA Division 3 Western Connecticut State University women's ice hockey team, which is making its NCAA Division III debut for the 2026-27 season.

== "Thank You Canada" ==
In 1980, the government of Canada helped six Americans escape from Iran when students stormed the US embassy, precipitating the Iran Hostage Crisis. Looney, then eight years old, wrote a letter of thanks to Canada. The letter was later transcribed and released as a single by Mercury Records in March 1980 under the title "(This Is My Country) Thank You, Canada". The brief (1:26) spoken-word record received some airplay and made Cashbox's Top 100 (three weeks, peaking at #98) and Billboard Magazine's "Bubbling Under The Hot 100" chart nationally, peaking at #109.

== Awards and honors ==
- 1993 – ECAC Tournament Most Valuable Player
- 2019 – Inducted into the U.S. Olympic and Paralympic Hall of Fame, along with other members of the 1998 U.S. Women's ice hockey team.

Preceded by Position created; Ric Seiling (co-coach)	Buffalo Beauts head coach 2015–2016	Succeeded by Ric Seiling
