= Karyn Bye-Dietz =

American ice hockey player (born 1971)

Karyn Bye
- Born: May 18, 1971 (age 55) River Falls, Wisconsin, U.S.
- Height: 5 ft 8 in (173 cm)
- Weight: 165 lb (75 kg; 11 st 11 lb)
- Position: Forward
- ECAC team: New Hampshire Wildcats (1989–1993)
- National team: United States
- Playing career: 1989–2002
Medal record
Representing United States
Women's ice hockey
Olympic Games
Gold medal – first place	1998 Nagano	Tournament
Silver medal – second place	2002 Salt Lake City	Tournament
IIHF World Women's Championships
Silver medal – second place	1992 Finland	Tournament
Silver medal – second place	1994 United States	Tournament
Silver medal – second place	1997 Canada	Tournament
Silver medal – second place	1999 Finland	Tournament
Silver medal – second place	2000 Canada	Tournament
Silver medal – second place	2001 United States	Tournament

Karyn Lynn Bye (born May 18, 1971) is a retired ice hockey player. She was the alternate captain of the 1998 Winter Olympics gold-medal winning United States Women's Hockey Team.

In 1998, she was featured on a Wheaties box. She entered the IIHF Hall of Fame in 2011 and was inducted into the United States Hockey Hall of Fame in 2014.

== Playing career ==
=== Early years ===
Born on May 18, 1971, in River Falls, Wisconsin, Bye-Dietz played for the River Falls Wildcats Boys High School Hockey team under the name of K.L. Bye to conceal her sex. Although her father encouraged her to continue playing basketball, as she had done growing up, Bye-Dietz continued to play hockey. During the 1987–88 season, she recorded 3 assists in her 18 games playing Junior Varsity Hockey Her athletic ability and play earned her a scholarship to the University of New Hampshire.

=== NCAA ===
Bye played for the New Hampshire Wildcats women's ice hockey program. She scored 164 points in 87 games for the Wildcats, leading the team all four years. As captain of the team during her junior and senior season, she twice led the Wildcats to the ECAC championships.

Bye graduated from New Hampshire with a B.S. in physical education. From there, she attended graduate school at Concordia University in Montreal. She played for the Concordia Stingers women's ice hockey team while earning a graduate degree in sports administration.

=== USA Hockey ===
Bye made her national team debut with Team USA at the 1992 IIHF Women's World Championship. From there, she competed in five more tournaments, winning silver in all.

In 1998, Bye led Team United States to their first Olympic gold medal at the 1998 Winter Olympics in Nagano. She led the team with five goals in six games and tied Cammi Granato and two others for the scoring lead with eight points. She competed with Team USA again at the 2002 Winter Olympics where they won a silver medal.

On December 16, 2010, she was selected to the International Ice Hockey Federation Hall of Fame class of 2011.

== Personal ==
Bye has worked for the Minnesota Wild in its grassroots program. She teaches fitness classes at her local YMCA and previously coached her son's Mite Level 1 hockey team. As of 2010, she was also a color commentator for the Minnesota Girls State High School Hockey Tournament.

Bye married a strength and fitness coach at the University of Minnesota, and they have two children.

In 1998, Bye was featured on a Wheaties box.

== Awards and honors ==
- 1995 Concordia University Fittest Female Athlete
- 1995 and 1998 Bob Allen Women's Player of the Year Award
- She was inducted into the University of New Hampshire Hall of Fame in 1998.

== See also ==
- Ice hockey at the 2002 Winter Olympics
- United States at the 2002 Winter Olympics
- Ice hockey at the 1998 Winter Olympics
