= 1995 IIHF European Women Championships =

The 1995 IIHF European Women Championships were held between March 20–31, 1995. Continuing with the format from 1993, the Elite division Pool A, consisted of six teams, while the five teams that competed in 1993 were joined by Russia and Slovakia making their debut appearances, while the Netherlands returned for the first time since 1991.

The Pool A tournament was held in Riga, Latvia, while the expanded Pool B took place in Odense and Esbjerg in Denmark

== European Championship Group A ==
1995 IIHF European Women's Championship
Pool A

Tournament details
- Host country: Latvia
- Venue: Riga (in 1 host city)
- Dates: March 20 - March 25
- Teams: 6

Final positions
- Champions: Finland (4th title)

Tournament statistics
- Games played: 15
- Goals scored: 152 (10.13 per game)

=== Teams & format ===
Six teams completed in Pool A, with Latvia joining the group after winning the 1993 Pool B tournament. The teams were:

- Finland
- Germany
- Latvia
- Norway
- Switzerland
- Sweden

In a change to the 1993 format, the group system was abolished (as were the final games) and it was replaced with a single round robin between the teams, with the highest ranked team winning the Championship.

=== Final round ===
==== Standings ====
Pos	Team	Pld	W	D	L	GF	GA	GD	Pts
1	Finland	5	5	0	0	61	2	+59	10
2	Sweden	5	4	0	1	27	10	+17	8
3	Switzerland	5	3	0	2	11	20	−9	6
4	Norway	5	2	0	3	7	20	−13	4
5	Germany	5	1	0	4	11	35	−24	2
6	Latvia	5	0	0	5	5	35	−30	0

==== Results ====
March 20, 1995	Sweden	5 – 0 (2 - 0, 2 - 0, 1 - 0)	Norway	Riga

March 20, 1995	Finland	13 – 2 (6 - 0, 3 - 2, 4 - 0)	Germany	Riga

March 20, 1995	Switzerland	3 – 1 (2 - 0, 1 - 1, 0 - 0)	Latvia	Riga

March 21, 1995	Finland	12 – 0 (4 - 0, 6 - 0, 2 - 0)	Norway	Riga

March 21, 1995	Sweden	7 – 0 (1 - 0, 5 - 0, 1 - 0)	Switzerland	Riga

March 21, 1995	Germany	5 – 4 (3 - 1, 1 - 0, 1 - 3)	Latvia	Riga

March 22, 1995	Finland	10 – 0 (2 - 0, 6 - 0, 2 - 0)	Switzerland	Riga

March 22, 1995	Norway	5 – 1 (2 - 1, 2 - 0, 1 - 0)	Germany	Riga

March 22, 1995	Sweden	8 – 0 (4 - 0, 2 - 0, 2 - 0)	Latvia	Riga

March 24, 1995	Sweden	7 – 1 (2 - 0, 2 - 1, 3 - 0)	Germany	Riga

March 24, 1995	Switzerland	2 – 0 (0 - 0, 1 - 0, 1 - 0)	Norway	Riga

March 24, 1995	Finland	17 – 0 (4 - 0, 8 - 0, 5 - 0)	Latvia	Riga

March 25, 1995	Switzerland	6 – 2 (1 - 0, 3 - 0, 2 - 2)	Germany	Riga

March 25, 1995	Norway	2 – 0 (0 - 0, 2 - 0, 0 - 0)	Latvia	Riga

March 25, 1995	Finland	9 – 0 (4 - 0, 3 - 0, 2 - 0)	Sweden	Riga

=== Champions ===
1995 IIHF European Women Championship winners

Finland
4th title

== European Championship Group B ==
1995 IIHF European Women's Championship
Pool B

Tournament details
- Host country: Denmark
- Venue(s): Esbjerg, Gentofte, Odense (in 3 host cities)
- Dates: March 27 - March 31
- Teams: 8

Final positions
- Champions: Russia (1st title)

Tournament statistics
- Games played: 16
- Goals scored: 131 (8.19 per game)

=== Teams & format ===
The eight teams that competed in Pool B were:

- Czech Republic
- Denmark
- France
- Great Britain
- Netherlands
- Russia
- Slovakia
- Ukraine

The teams were split into two groups of four teams as below. At the end of the group stage, the teams would play the team that finished in the same position in the opposite group in a playoff match, i.e. Winner of Group A played Winner of Group B for the Gold Medal.

=== First round ===
==== Group 1 ====
===== Standings =====
Pos	Team	Pld	W	D	L	GF	GA	GD	Pts
1	Denmark	3	3	0	0	23	2	+21	6
2	Slovakia	3	1	1	1	9	8	+1	3
3	Netherlands	3	1	1	1	11	12	−1	3
4	Great Britain	3	0	0	3	4	25	−21	0

===== Results =====
March 27, 1995	Slovakia	4 – 1 (2 - 0, 0 - 0, 2 - 1)	Great Britain	Odense

March 27, 1995	Denmark	6 – 0 (2 - 0, 1 - 0, 3 - 0)	Netherlands	Odense

March 28, 1995	Slovakia	4 – 4 (1 - 1, 2 - 2, 1 - 1)	Netherlands	Odense

March 28, 1995	Denmark	14 – 1 (4 - 0, 0 - 0, 10 - 1)	Great Britain	Odense

March 30, 1995	Netherlands	7 – 2 (4 - 1, 0 - 1, 3 - 0)	Great Britain	Odense

March 30, 1995	Denmark	3 – 1 (1 - 0, 2 - 1, 0 - 0)	Slovakia	Odense

==== Group 2 ====
===== Standings =====
Pos	Team	Pld	W	D	L	GF	GA	GD	Pts
1	Russia	3	3	0	0	37	1	+36	6
2	Czech Republic	3	2	0	1	15	11	+4	4
3	France	3	1	0	2	9	23	−14	2
4	Ukraine	3	0	0	3	2	28	−26	0

===== Results =====
March 27, 1995	Russia	8 – 1 (3 - 0, 3 - 0, 2 - 1)	Czech Republic	Esbjerg

March 27, 1995	France	7 – 1 (2 - 0, 1 - 1, 4 - 0)	Ukraine	Esbjerg

March 28, 1995	Czech Republic	7 – 1 (2 - 1, 4 - 0, 1 - 0)	Ukraine	Esbjerg

March 28, 1995	Russia	15 – 0 (8 - 0, 4 - 0, 3 - 0)	France	Esbjerg

March 30, 1995	Czech Republic	7 – 2 (1 - 0, 4 - 2, 2 - 0)	France	Esbjerg

March 30, 1995	Russia	14 – 0 (6 - 0, 2 - 0, 6 - 0)	Ukraine	Esbjerg

=== Playoff round ===
==== Consolation round 7–8 place ====
March 31, 1995	Great Britain	2 – 0 (0 - 0, 1 - 0, 1 - 0)	Ukraine	Esbjerg

==== Consolation round 5–6 place ====
March 31, 1995	France	4 – 3 (2 - 1, 0 - 0, 2 - 2)	Netherlands	Esbjerg

==== Match for third place ====
March 31, 1995	Czech Republic	7 – 1 (3 - 0, 3 - 0, 1 - 1)	Slovakia	Gentofte

==== Final ====
March 31, 1995	Russia	4 – 0 (2 - 0, 1 - 0, 1 - 0)	Denmark	Gentofte

== Final standings ==
Rk.	Team	Notes
1st place, gold medalist(s)	Finland	
2nd place, silver medalist(s)	Sweden	
3rd place, bronze medalist(s)	Switzerland	
4.	Norway	
5.	Germany	
6.	Latvia	Relegated to Pool B for 1996 European Championship
7.	Russia	Promoted to Pool A for 1996 European Championship
8.	Denmark	
9.	Czech Republic	
10.	Slovakia	
11.	France	
12.	Netherlands	
13.	Great Britain	
14.	Ukraine	

== See also ==
- IIHF European Women Championships
