= 1993 IIHF European Women Championships =

1993 IIHF European Women's Championship
Pool A

Tournament details
- Host country: Denmark
- Venue: 1 (in 1 host city)
- Dates: 24–27 March
- Teams: 6

Final positions
- Champions: Finland (3rd title)
- Runners-up: Sweden
- Third place: Norway
- Fourth place: Germany

Tournament statistics
- Games played: 9
- Goals scored: 89 (9.89 per game)
- Scoring leader: (Finland) Hanna Teerijoki (13 points)

The 1993 IIHF European Women Championships were held between 22 and 27 March 1993. In a break with the previous format, the IIHF split the teams into two separate divisions, A and B, and introduced a promotion and relegation system between them.

The top six teams from the 1991 tournament qualified for the Pool A tournament in Esbjerg, Denmark, while the remaining nations played in Ukraine, as Ukraine entering their first tournament.

== Teams & Format ==
The six teams, qualified from being the top six teams from the 1991 tournament were:

- Denmark
- Finland
- Germany
- Norway
- Switzerland
- Sweden

The teams were divided into two groups of three teams. Each team played each other once within the group. The teams then played a playoff game against the team with the same position in the opposing group, i.e. the Group Winners played off for Gold, 2nd place, for Bronze etc.

== First round ==
=== Group 1 ===
==== Standings ====
| Pos | Team | Pld | W | D | L | GF | GA | GD | Pts |
|---|---|---|---|---|---|---|---|---|---|
| 1 | Finland | 2 | 2 | 0 | 0 | 25 | 4 | +21 | 4 |
| 2 | Norway | 2 | 1 | 0 | 1 | 8 | 10 | −2 | 2 |
| 3 | Switzerland | 2 | 0 | 0 | 2 | 3 | 22 | −19 | 0 |

==== Results ====
| March 24, 1993 | Norway | 5 – 2 (1 - 2, 2 - 0, 2 - 0) | Switzerland | Esbjerg |

| March 25, 1993 | Finland | 17 – 1 (10 - 0, 1 - 0, 6 - 1) | Switzerland | Esbjerg |

| March 26, 1993 | Finland | 8 – 3 (2 - 1, 4 - 0, 2 - 2) | Norway | Esbjerg |

=== Group 2 ===
==== Standings ====
| Pos | Team | Pld | W | D | L | GF | GA | GD | Pts |
|---|---|---|---|---|---|---|---|---|---|
| 1 | Sweden | 2 | 2 | 0 | 0 | 16 | 3 | +13 | 4 |
| 2 | Germany | 2 | 1 | 0 | 1 | 9 | 14 | −5 | 2 |
| 3 | Denmark | 2 | 0 | 0 | 2 | 4 | 12 | −8 | 0 |

==== Results ====
| March 24, 1993 | Germany | 6 – 4 (2 - 3, 0 - 1, 4 - 0) | Denmark | Esbjerg |

| March 25, 1993 | Sweden | 10 – 3 (3 - 0, 2 - 2, 5 - 1) | Germany | Esbjerg |

| March 26, 1993 | Sweden | 6 – 0 (3 - 0, 1 - 0, 2 - 0) | Denmark | Esbjerg |

== Playoffs ==
=== Consolation round 5-6 Place ===
| March 27, 1993 | Switzerland | 4 – 1 (0 - 0, 3 - 1, 1 - 0) | Denmark | Esbjerg |

=== Match for third place ===
| March 27, 1993 | Norway | 6 – 3 (1 - 1, 3 - 1, 2 - 1) | Germany | Esbjerg |

=== Final ===
| March 27, 1993 | Finland | 8 – 2 (3 - 2, 3 - 0, 2 - 0) | Sweden | Esbjerg |

=== Champions ===
1993 IIHF European Women Championship winners

Finland
3rd title

== European Championship Group B ==
1993 IIHF European Women's Championship
Pool B

Tournament details
- Host country: Ukraine
- Venue: 1 (in 1 host city)
- Dates: 22–27 March
- Teams: 5

Final positions
- Champions: Latvia (1st title)

Tournament statistics
- Games played: 10
- Goals scored: 36 (3.6 per game)

=== Teams & Format ===
The five teams that playing the first Pool B were:

- Czech Republic
- France
- Great Britain
- Latvia
- Ukraine

The teams were placed in one group containing all the teams playing in a single round robin format, with the final placings determining the final standing without any final games.

=== Final round ===
==== Standings ====
| Pos | Team | Pld | W | D | L | GF | GA | GD | Pts |
|---|---|---|---|---|---|---|---|---|---|
| 1 | Latvia | 4 | 3 | 0 | 1 | 10 | 5 | +5 | 6 |
| 2 | Czech Republic | 4 | 2 | 1 | 1 | 8 | 6 | +2 | 5 |
| 3 | France | 4 | 2 | 0 | 2 | 13 | 9 | +4 | 4 |
| 4 | Great Britain | 4 | 1 | 1 | 2 | 4 | 11 | −7 | 3 |
| 5 | Ukraine | 4 | 1 | 0 | 3 | 1 | 5 | −4 | 2 |

==== Results ====
| March 22, 1993 | Latvia | 4 – 3 (2 - 0, 1 - 1, 1 - 2) | France | Kyiv |

| March 22, 1993 | Czech Republic | 3 – 0 (1 - 0, 1 - 0, 1 - 0) | Ukraine | Kyiv |

| March 23, 1993 | Latvia | 3 – 1 (1 - 0, 0 - 0, 2 - 1) | Czech Republic | Kyiv |

| March 23, 1993 | Great Britain | 1 – 0 (1 - 0, 0 - 0, 0 - 0) | Ukraine | Kyiv |

| March 24, 1993 | France | 7 – 2 (3 - 1, 3 - 0, 1 - 1) | Great Britain | Kyiv |

| March 25, 1993 | Ukraine | 1 – 0 (0 - 0, 1 - 0, 0 - 0) | Latvia | Kyiv |

| March 26, 1993 | Latvia | 3 – 0 (1 - 0, 2 - 0, 0 - 0) | Great Britain | Kyiv |

| March 26, 1993 | Czech Republic | 3 – 2 (1 - 1, 2 - 0, 0 - 1) | France | Kyiv |

| March 27, 1993 | Czech Republic | 1 – 1 (1 - 1, 0 - 0, 0 - 0) | Great Britain | Kyiv |

| March 27, 1993 | France | 1 – 0 (1 - 0, 0 - 0, 0 - 0) | Ukraine | Kyiv |

== Final standings ==
| Rk. | Team | Notes |
|---|---|---|
| 1st place, gold medalist(s) | Finland | Qualified for 1994 World Championship |
| 2nd place, silver medalist(s) | Sweden | Qualified for 1994 World Championship |
| 3rd place, bronze medalist(s) | Norway | Qualified for 1994 World Championship |
| 4. | Germany | Qualified for 1994 World Championship |
| 5. | Switzerland | Qualified for 1994 World Championship |
| 6. | Denmark | Relegated to Pool B for 1995 European Championship |
| 7. | Latvia | Promoted to Pool A for 1995 European Championship |
| 8. | Czech Republic | |
| 9. | France | |
| 10. | Great Britain | |
| 11. | Ukraine | |

== See also ==
- IIHF European Women Championships
