= List of bandy clubs in Finland =

There are a number of sports clubs in Finland which are playing bandy. The top-tier Finnish bandy league, Bandyliiga, contains 9 teams. The second-tier league, Suomisarja, contains 7 teams.

== Bandyliiga ==
- Porvoon Akilles, Porvoo
- Botnia-69, Helsinki
- HIFK Bandy, Helsinki
- JPS, Jyväskylä
- Mikkelin Kampparit, Mikkeli
- Narukerä, Pori
- Oulun Luistinseura, Oulu
- Veiterä, Lappeenranta
- WP 35, Varkaus

Updated for 2014-15 season.

== Suomisarja ==
- HIFK/2, Helsinki
- Uleåborg IFK, Oulu
- Veiterä/2, Lappeenranta
- Lennex BK, Oulu
- Vesta, Helsinki
- Kampparit/2, Mikkeli
- JPS/2, Jyväskylä

Updated for 2014-15 season.

== Others ==
- Sudet
- Oulun Palloseura
- Tornio PV
- Vastus
