= List of Finnish women bandy champions =

List of Finnish women bandy champions. The first women's championships in bandy were only played in 1979. No women's championships were played 1993–2005.

== Winners through the years ==
- 1979 Veitsiluodon Vastus
- 1980 Veitsiluodon Vastus
- 1981 Lauttasaaren Pyrintö
- 1982 Oulun Luistinseura
- 1983 Oulun Luistinseura
- 1984 Lauttasaaren Pyrintö
- 1985 Jyväskylän Seudun Palloseura
- 1986 IFK Helsingfors
- 1987 IFK Helsingfors
- 1988 Oulun Luistinseura
- 1989 Jyväskylän Seudun Palloseura
- 1990 Jyväskylän Seudun Palloseura
- 1991 Jyväskylän Seudun Palloseura
- 1992 Jyväskylän Seudun Palloseura
- 1993–2005 no women's championships
- 2006 Botnia-69, Helsinki
- 2007 Botnia-69, Helsinki
- 2008 Botnia-69, Helsinki
- 2009 Botnia-69, Helsinki
- 2010 Tornion Palloveikot
- 2011 IFK Helsingfors, Helsinki
- 2012 Veiterä, Lappeenranta
- 2013 Veitsiluodon Vastus
- 2014 Sudet, Kouvola
- 2015 Sudet, Kouvola
- 2016 Sudet, Kouvola
- 2017 Sudet, Kouvola
- 2018 Sudet, Kouvola
- 2019 Sudet, Kouvola

== Titles ==
=== Women's titles per club ===
- 6: Sudet
- 5: Jyväskylän Seudun Palloseura
- 4: Botnia-69
- 3: Oulun Luistinseura
- 3: IFK Helsingfors
- 3: Veitsiluodon Vastus
- 2: Lautasaaren Pyrintö
- 1: Tornion Palloveikot
- 1: Lappeenrannan Veiterä

=== Men's and women's titles the same year ===
Double Titles	Club	Years
2	Oulun Luistinseura	1982, 1983
2	IFK Helsingfors	1987, 2011

== See also ==
- List of Finnish bandy champions
