= Finnish Cup (bandy) =

The Finnish Cup (Suomen Cup, or Finska cupen) in bandy was played for the first time in 1960 and has been played on and off since then. The competition has now been held annually since 2014. It is arranged by Finland's Bandy Association.

== Finals ==
Year	Winner	Runner up	Result
1959–1960	Oulun Palloseura	Kouvolan Urheilijain Palloilijat	9–4
1961–1987	Not played		
1988	Oulun Luistinseura	Veitsiluodon Vastus	6–3
1990	Helsingin IFK	Oulun Luistinseura	6–5
1991	Warkauden Pallo -35	Oulun Luistinseura	6–2
1992	Helsingin IFK	Warkauden Pallo -35	4–1
1993	Warkauden Pallo -35	Helsingin IFK	10–2
1994–2011	Not played		
2012–2013	epävirallisen kilpailun voitti Botnia.		
2013–2014	Jyväskylän Seudun Palloseura	Mikkelin Kampparit	6–1
2014–2015	Lappeenrannan Veiterä	Mikkelin Kampparit	4–3
2015–2016	Botnia-69	Jyväskylän Seudun Palloseura	5–3
2016–2017	Jyväskylän Seudun Palloseura	Lappeenrannan Veiterä	4–3
2017-2018	Lappeenrannan Veiterä	Jyväskylän Seudun Palloseura	8–2
2018–2019	Porvoon Akilles	Lappeenrannan Veiterä	3–2
2019–2020	Porvoon Akilles	Lappeenrannan Veiterä	3–2
2020–2021	Porvoon Akilles	Lappeenrannan Veiterä	6–1
