= Hanna Teerijoki =

Finnish multi-sport athlete (born 1963)

- Born: Hanna Elisabeth Heikura; 15 July 1963 (age 63); Kemi, Finland
Bandy career
- Playing position: Forward
Club information
- Current team: HIFK
Youth career
- Vastus
Senior career*
Years	Team	Apps^{†}	(Gls)^{†}
1978–1984	Vastus		
1984–1987	HIFK		
1987–1988	AIK		
1988–1990	Hasle-Løren		
1989–1990	Tåsen		
1990–1991	Västerstrands		
1993–1994	Västerstrands		
National team
	Finland	24	
- * Senior club appearances and goals counted for the domestic league only. † Appearances (Goals).
Ice hockey career
- Position: Forward
- Played for: FoC Farsta; Kiekko-Espoo; Etelä-Vantaan Urheilijat
- National team: Finland
- Playing career: c. 1982–1997
Association football career
Senior career*
Years	Team	Apps	(Gls)
c. 1984–1988	HJK		
International career
1986	Finland	1	
- * Club domestic league appearances and goals

Hanna Elisabeth Teerijoki née Heikura (born 15 July 1963) is a Finnish multi-sport athlete and the only European to represent their country on the national team in six different sports. Best known as a bandy and ice hockey player, she won a sum of 26 Finnish Championships in association football, bandy and rink bandy, field hockey, and golf, and two Swedish Championships in ice hockey.

== Bandy career ==
Teerijoki began playing bandy as a child with the bandy club Veitsiluodon Vastus in her home town of Kemi, a town on the southwestern coast of Lapland. As the club did not have teams for girls, she played on the boys' junior teams and was noted as a skilled player from an early age. She won the Finnish Championship (SM) in boys' under-12 (E-nuorten) bandy with Vastus in 1974.

Vastus created a women's representative team in the late 1970s and Teerijoki moved from the boys' junior teams to the newly created team. She played with Vastus during 1978 to 1984, winning the inaugural Finnish Championship in women's bandy in 1979 and claiming the title again in 1980. During her tenure with Vastus, she was named Women's Player of the Year (Vuoden Naispelaaja) by the Finnish Bandy Association in 1979, 1980, 1981, 1982, 1983, and 1984.

For the 1984–85 season, she relocated to the women's team of HIFK Bandy in Helsinki. Her first season with the team was a great success and resulted in her third Finnish Championship title. Teerijoki spent another two seasons with HIFK, helping the team claim the Finnish Championship title again in 1987. Remaining the most dominant player in Finnish women's bandy, she was named Women's Player of the Year in each year with HIFK – 1985, 1986, and 1987.

Teerijoki opted to play abroad for the 1987–88 season, joining AIK Bandy Dam in the Division I i bandy för damer, the top women's bandy league in Sweden. She immediately lit up the league, leading all players in scoring with 50 points in ten games, and propelling AIK to Swedish Championship victory in 1988. Her excellent performance drew attention from the Finnish Bandy Association and she was named Women's Player of the Year for the tenth consecutive season.

The following season, she signed with the women’s bandy team of the Norwegian multi-sport club Hasle-Løren IL in the NM i bandy for damer ('Norwegian Championship in bandy for women'). With Hasle-Løren, she was Norwegian Champion in women’s bandy in 1989 and 1990. For the 1989–90 season, she also played with the men’s representative bandy team of Tåsen IL in the 1. divisjon bandy for menn ('Division 1 bandy for men') and earned her eleventh selection as the Finnish Bandy Association's Women's Player of the Year.

Returning to Sweden for the 1990–91 season, she played with the women’s representative bandy team of Västerstrands AIK. In a repeat of the success found in her rookie Division I i bandy för damer season, Teerijoki topped the league's scoring charts, this time with 41 points in ten games, and led her team to victory in the 1991 Swedish Championship. She won the Swedish Championship with Västerstrands AIK again in 1994.

At one point, the men's representative team of HIFK Bandy took steps to sign Teerijoki to their roster but the Finnish Bandy Association responded by institututing a new rule baring a woman from playing on a men's team. Describing the drastic measures taken to bar her from playing, Teerijoki admitted "Yes, it left me with a little scar. It is great that it’s possible [for a woman to play in a men's league] today and that people are able to do so… even through, in my own case, I wasn’t able to try. That feeling is missing from my life: I never got to experience it." Though she was never able to play in the Bandyliiga herself, Teerijoki coached the HIFK men’s representative team in the 1993–94 Bandyliiga season.

Women's bandy in Finland experienced a sharp decline in popularity during the 1990s and Teerijoki opted to focus on other sports for many years, ending her career as a bandy player in 1994.

Medal record

Representing Finland

Women's bandy

World Championship
Bronze medal – third place	2004 Finland	

When the first Women's Bandy World Championship was organized in 2004, Finnish national team head coach Seppo Jolkkonen invited 41-year-old Teerijoki to national team camp. Teerijoki was initially amused by the invitation, having not played bandy at the national level for twelve years, but she regained confidence in her skill during training camp and was elected captain by the team. She captained Finland to a bronze medal finish in the 2004 Women's Bandy World Championship.

In the late 2010s, Teerijoki returned to national-level bandy competition, playing with the HIFK Bandy women's team in the Jääpallon naisten SM-sarja ('Finnish Championship Series in Women's Bandy'). She was named the 2020 Naisten SM-sarja Player of the Year after leading her team in scoring and ranking fifth in the league overall, with 17 points (10+7) in nine games. Regarding her selection, 56-year-old Teerijoki said, "I am happy and grateful but probably think that someone else could have won."

As of 2020, Teerijoki is a member of the Women's and Girls' Bandy Committee of the Finnish Bandy Association.

=== Quotes ===
- "Bandy has always been my favorite sport. It’s a very technically demanding sport that requires a lot of fitness."
- "Bandy is Tchaikovsky and ice hockey is punk rock."
- "Football and field hockey are practically slowed down versions of bandy. Golf is different, but I’ve been able to draw hitting and swinging from bandy."

=== Awards and achievements ===
- World Championship Bronze Medal: 2004
- Finnish Champion in women's bandy (4): 1978–79, 1979–80 (Vastus); 1984–85, 1986–87 (HIFK)
- Finnish Bandy Association's Women's Player of the Year (11): 1979, 1980, 1981, 1982, 1983, 1984, 1985, 1986, 1987, 1988, 1990
- Jääpallon naisten SM-sarja Player of the Year (1): 2020
- Finnish Bandy Association’s Gallery of Honor: inducted in 2012, first class
- Swedish Champion in women's bandy (3): 1987–88 (AIK); 1990–91, 1993–94 (Västerstrands AIK)
- Division I i bandy för damer Top scorer (2): 1987–88, 1990–91
- Norwegian Champion in women's bandy (2): 1988–89, 1989–90 (Hasle-Løren)

== Ice hockey career ==
Medal record

Representing Finland

Women's ice hockey

World Championship
Bronze medal – third place	1994 United States	
Bronze medal – third place	1992 Finland	

European Championship
Gold medal – first place	1993 Denmark	

Though bandy differs from ice hockey in several fundamental ways, the two have undeniable similarities and Teerijoki is one of a number of Finns who transitioned between the sports with relative ease. Other Finnish players who notably found success in both bandy and ice hockey include Pirjo Ahonen and Riikka Sallinen.

Teerijoki appeared with the women's team of Etelä-Vantaan Urheilijat (EVU) in the early years of the Naisten SM-sarja, first playing with the team during the 1983–84 season, in which they won Finnish Championship silver. She later played with the women's team of Espoon Kiekkoseura (EKS), winning Finnish Championship bronze with them in 1991–92. EKS was transferred to Kiekko-Espoo in 1992 and Teerijoki went on to win another Finnish Championship bronze with the team under the Kiekko-Espoo banner in 1993–94.

She joined the women's ice hockey team of FoC Farsta in the Svenska mästerskapet i damhockey ('Swedish Championship in women's hockey') in 1994 and won the Swedish Championship with them in 1995 and 1997.

=== International play ===
The 1992 IIHF Women's World Championship served as her debut with the Finnish national ice hockey team. In addition to winning a bronze medal, she ranked behind only Riikka Sallinen as Finland’s top point scorer, with 8 points in five games; led the team in assists, with 5; and placed ninth in the tournament overall for points. The next year, she was the highest point scorer at the 1993 IIHF European Women Championships, leading the charge for Finland’s gold medal victory at the tournament. Her final major tournament with the national ice hockey team was the 1994 IIHF Women's World Championship, where she won a second bronze medal and, once again, ranked ninth in the tournament overall for points, with 9 points (5+4) in five games.

According to Teerijoki, she was invited to and initially joined the Norwegian national ice hockey team for the 1998 Winter Olympics in Nagano but backed out when she entered flight school.

=== Career statistics ===
==== International ====
Year	Team	Event	Result	GP	G	A	Pts	PIM
1992	Finland	WW	3rd place, bronze medalist(s)	5	3	5	8	2
1993	Finland	EC	1st place, gold medalist(s)	3	9	4	13	2
1994	Finland	WW	3rd place, bronze medalist(s)	5	5	4	9	0
Totals				13	17	13	30	4

== Other sports ==
=== Football ===
As a child, Teerijoki’s spent her summers playing association football, a sport that she has described as a slowed down version of bandy. When she moved to Helsinki in 1984, she contacted Helsingin Jalkapalloklubi (HJK) and, despite having no previous experience playing in an adult league, immediately started with the club’s team in the Jalkapallon naisten SM-sarja, the top level of women's football in Finland. Teerijoki won the Finnish Championship with HJK in 1984, 1986, 1987, and 1988, under the guidance of head coach Aulis Rytkönen, who she has described as the best coach she ever played for.

She played with the Finnish national team during the mid-1980s and made one appearance with the team during the 1986 season. Her football career was abruptly halted when she moved to Norway in 1988 to play professional bandy and her Norwegian manager insisted she cease playing due to concerns about potential injury.

=== Golf ===
Teerijoki she was a last-minute partner for Riikka Hakkarainen in the 2000 Ladies European Tour, the only pro-level tournament in which she represented Finland.

Teerijoki was coached in Sweden by Henri Rice, who also coached Annika Sörenstam. She currently serves as CEO of the golf department of HIFK, where she also works as a trainer.

In 2008, she was nominated for the Finnish Sports Gala award recognizing people who made significant contributions to the foundation of their sport (Finnish: Taustavoima, lit. 'Backing force') for her work promoting golf as a hobby.

Teerijoki and her brother, Jussi Heikura, own the largest golf course in Finland, Paloheinä Golf. The 30 hectare course is located in the Paloheinä subdivision in northern Helsinki and serves as the home course of HIFK Golf.

== Personal life ==
Teerijoki is a licensed pilot and was employed in the civilian sector during 1997 to 2003.

Her favorite golf course is Barsebäck in Skåne, Sweden.
