= HIFK =

Multi-sport association in Helsinki

Idrottsföreningen Kamraterna, Helsingfors
- Abbreviation: HIFK
- Formation: October 1897; 129 years ago
- Founder: Georges Doubitsky
- Founded at: Kruununhaka
- Type: Nonprofit
- Registration no.: 0624253-7
- Legal status: Registered association
- Headquarters: Döbelnsgatan 2 B 00260 Helsinki; Finland
- Coordinates: 60.1777045°N 24.9245096°E
- Fields: Athletics, bandy and rink bandy, bowling, floorball, football, handball, ice hockey
- Members: ≈ 3000 (2016)
- Official languages: Swedish (official); Finnish
- President: René Österman
- Secretary: Kimmo Niemistö
- Treasurer: Tom Ståhlberg
- Members: Niclas Berg; Tom Nybondas; Christoffer Perret
- Website: ifk.fi

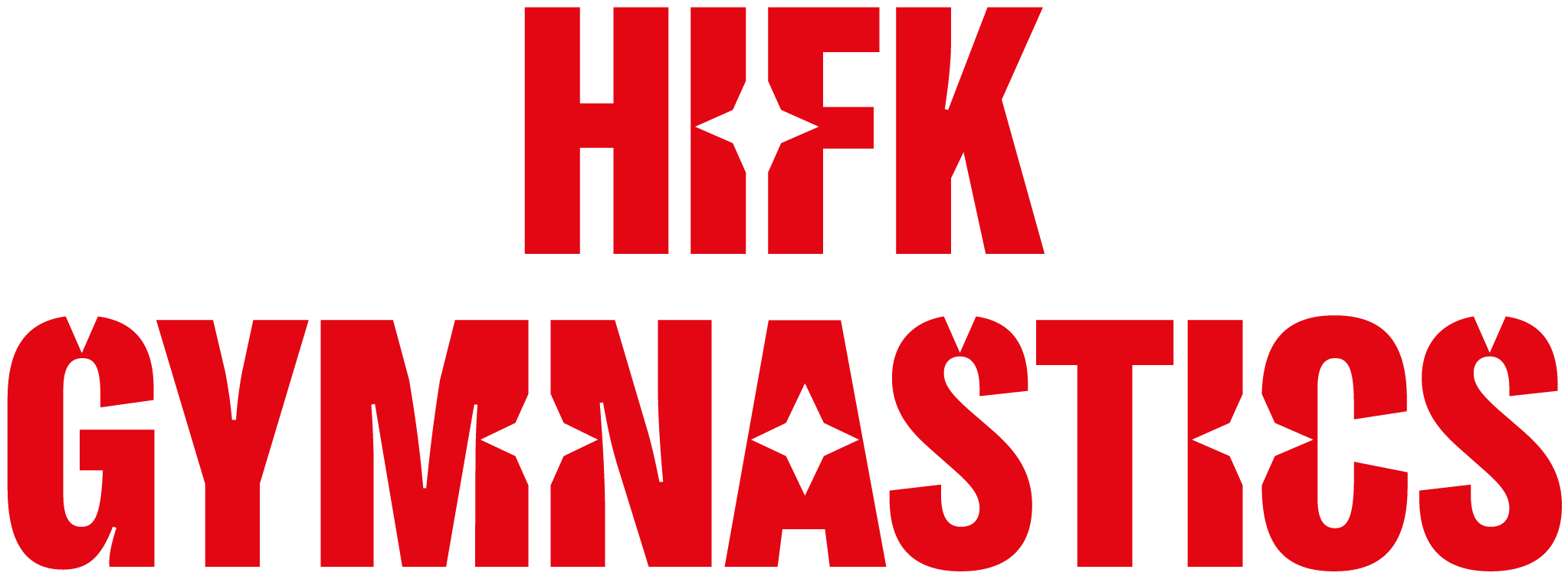
HIFK Gymnastics logo

HIFK, the Idrottsföreningen Kamraterna, Helsingfors (IFK, Helsingfors) rf (officially abbreviated IFK Helsingfors, colloquially often Helsingfors IFK or Helsingin IFK) is a multi-sport association based in Helsinki, Finland. Formed in 1897 on the initiative of Georges Doubitsky and fellow students of the Svenska Reallyceum, the Swedish lyceum in Helsinki, it is the oldest continuously operating Idrottsföreningen Kamraterna (IFK) organization in Finland. HIFK has sections in many sports, including athletics, bandy, bowling, football, ice hockey, and handball.

== Bandy ==
HIFK Bandy ry oversees the men's and women's representative teams, junior teams and bandy school, and recreational bandy programs. Kauko Rautiainen is chairman of HIFK Bandy ry.

The men's bandy section of HIFK was created in 1907 and the representative team has won the Finnish Championship seventeen times, more than any other club, and the Finnish Cup twice. The team plays in the Bandyliiga and their home arena is Brahenkenttä in the Alppiharju district.

HIFK women's team plays in the Jääpallon naisten SM-sarja (Women's Bandy Finnish Championship Series) and have won the Finnish Championship three times, in 1986, 1987, and 2011.

== Ice hockey ==
Oy HIFK Hockey Ab is the largest business within the HIFK association, comprising the men’s representative team in the Liiga, the women’s representative team in the Naisten Liiga, an expansive junior organization, and the hREDS eSports team.

=== eSport ===
In November 2016 an esports project was started under the name Helsinki REDS (hREDS).

== Athletics ==
The Athletics section of HIFK is one of Finland's oldest and most successful athletics clubs.

== Handball ==
The Handball section of HIFK is one of the pioneers of the sport in Finland. The men's section has won 10 national championships and the women's section 41 national championships. Both teams play their home games at the Helsinki Urheilutalo in the Kallio district of the city.

== Football ==
The football section of HIFK was established in 1907, and its first team earned promotion to Veikkausliiga for the 2015 season. The men's team currently plays in the fourth highest tier, and the women's team in the third highest tier.
