= 1994 World Ice Hockey Championships =

1994 World Ice Hockey Championships may refer to:

- 1994 Men's World Ice Hockey Championships
- 1994 IIHF Women's World Championship
