= Bandyliiga =

Finnish Championship men's bandy league

- Current season, competition or edition: 2024–25 Bandyliiga season
- Formerly: Jääpallon SM-sarja, 1908–1991
- Sport: Bandy
- Founded: 1908
- No. of teams: 8
- Country: Finland
- Headquarters: Helsinki
- Most recent champion: JPS (2) (2024–25)
- Most titles: HIFK Bandy (17)
- Broadcaster: Yle
- Relegation to: Suomi-sarja
- Website: bandyliiga.fi

The Bandyliiga (Swedish: Bandyligan; 'Bandy League') is the top level of men's bandy in Finland. The league was founded in 1908 as the Jääpallon SM-sarja ('Bandy Finnish Championship Series') and the present name has been used since the 1991–92 season. Bandyliiga is organized by the Finnish Bandy Association (Finnish: Suomen Jääpalloliitto) and the current chairman is Mika Mutikainen.

The 2024–25 Bandyliiga season marked the 115th season in which the Finnish Championship was contested and comprised eight teams. JPS are the reigning Finnish Champions, having won the 2025 Bandyliiga playoffs.

== History ==
The competitive side of men's bandy in Finland was organized in 1907 and the first Finnish Championship series was played in the winter of 1908. The very first title was won by Polyteknikkojen Urheiluseura, who beat IFK Helsingfors in the final match with a score of 8–3. The championship was decided as a cup competition until 1931. The league was played as single round-robin tournament with various numbers of divisions up until the 1969–70 season, when the current double round-robin format was introduced. The season was split into regular season and playoffs in the 1976–77 season.

The competition has been played every year since 1908, with the exceptions of 1918, 1940 and 1942, when the competition was cancelled first due to Finnish Civil War and then due to Winter War and the Continuation War. An unofficial wartime league was played during those years.

In 2008 Bandyliiga celebrated its 100th anniversary with a grand final match of the season, when Oulun Luistinseura beat Tornion Palloveikot in a penalty shoot-out and claimed the Finnish championship.

The 2014–15 season of Bandyliiga ended with Mikkelin Kampparit taking their second championship title. Kampparit beat HIFK 6–3 in the final, played in HIFK's homeground Kallio Ice Rink. The 2016–17 season ended with Veiterä taking their fifth championship title (first since 1980). Veiterä beat Akilles 3–5 in the final, played in Akilles' homeground in Porvoo.

== Teams ==
=== 2024–25 season ===
Team	City	Stadium	Founded
Akilles	Porvoo	Porvoon pallokenttä	1902
Botnia-69	Helsinki	Oulunkylä Ice Rink	1969
HIFK	Helsinki	Brahenkenttä	1897
JPS	Jyväskylä	Viitaniemen liikuntapuisto	1962
Kampparit	Mikkeli	Hänninhauta	1972
Narukerä	Pori	Porin tekojäärata	1964
OLS	Oulu	Pakkalan kenttä	1880
Veiterä	Lappeenranta	Kisapuiston tekojäärata	1950

== Recent champions ==
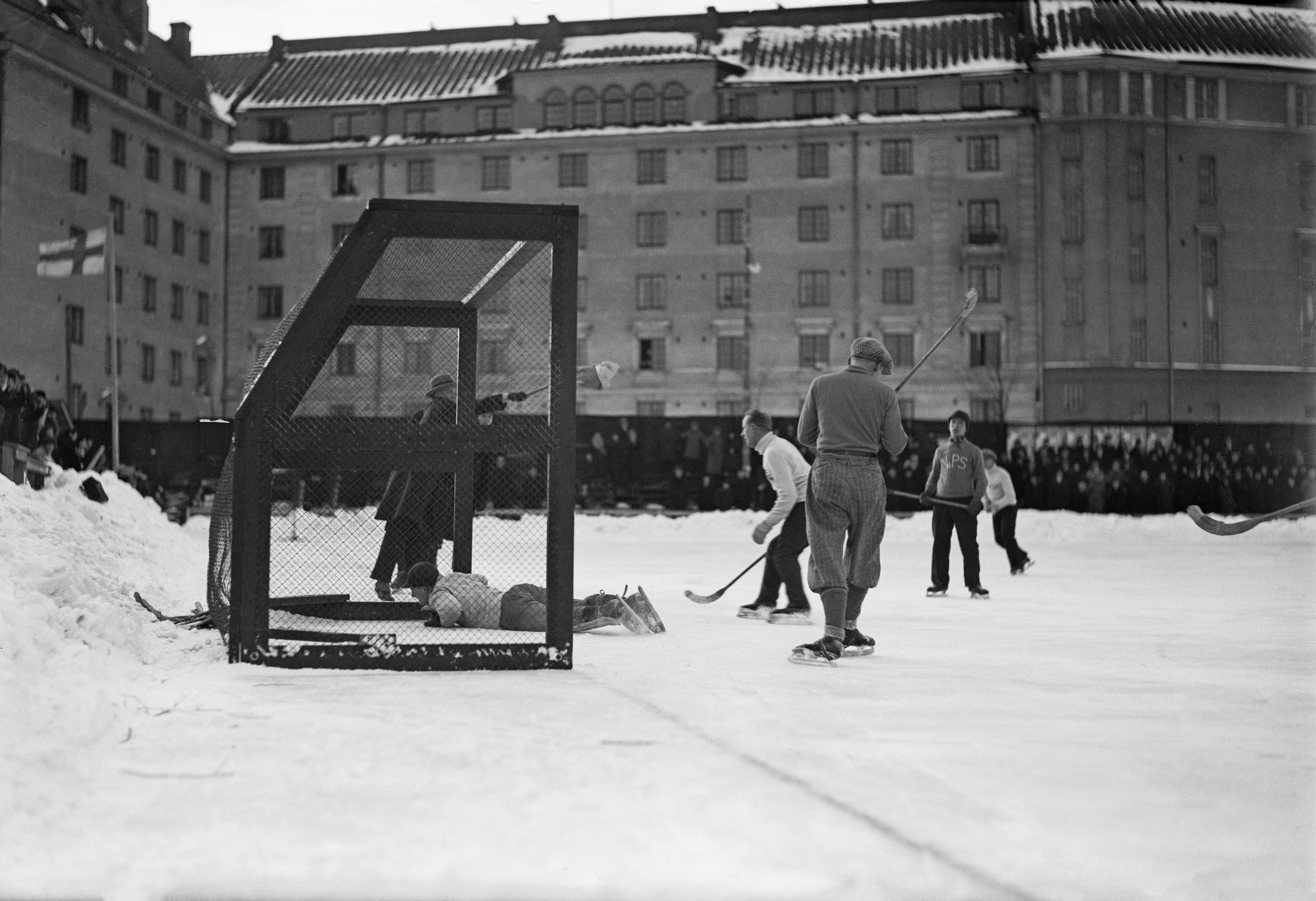
HJK - ViPS in Helsinki (1932)

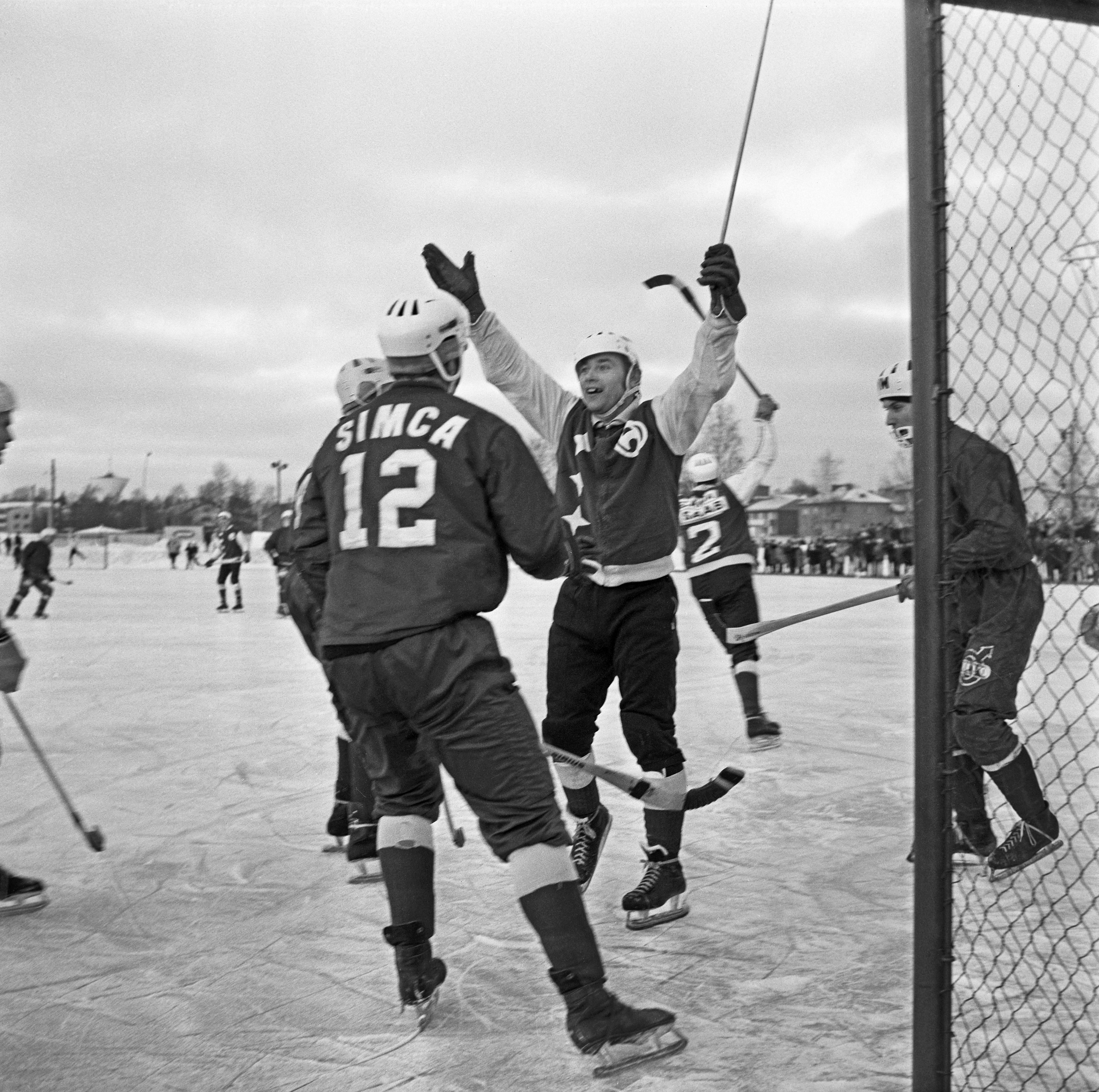
Akilles - LaPa in Porvoo (1971)

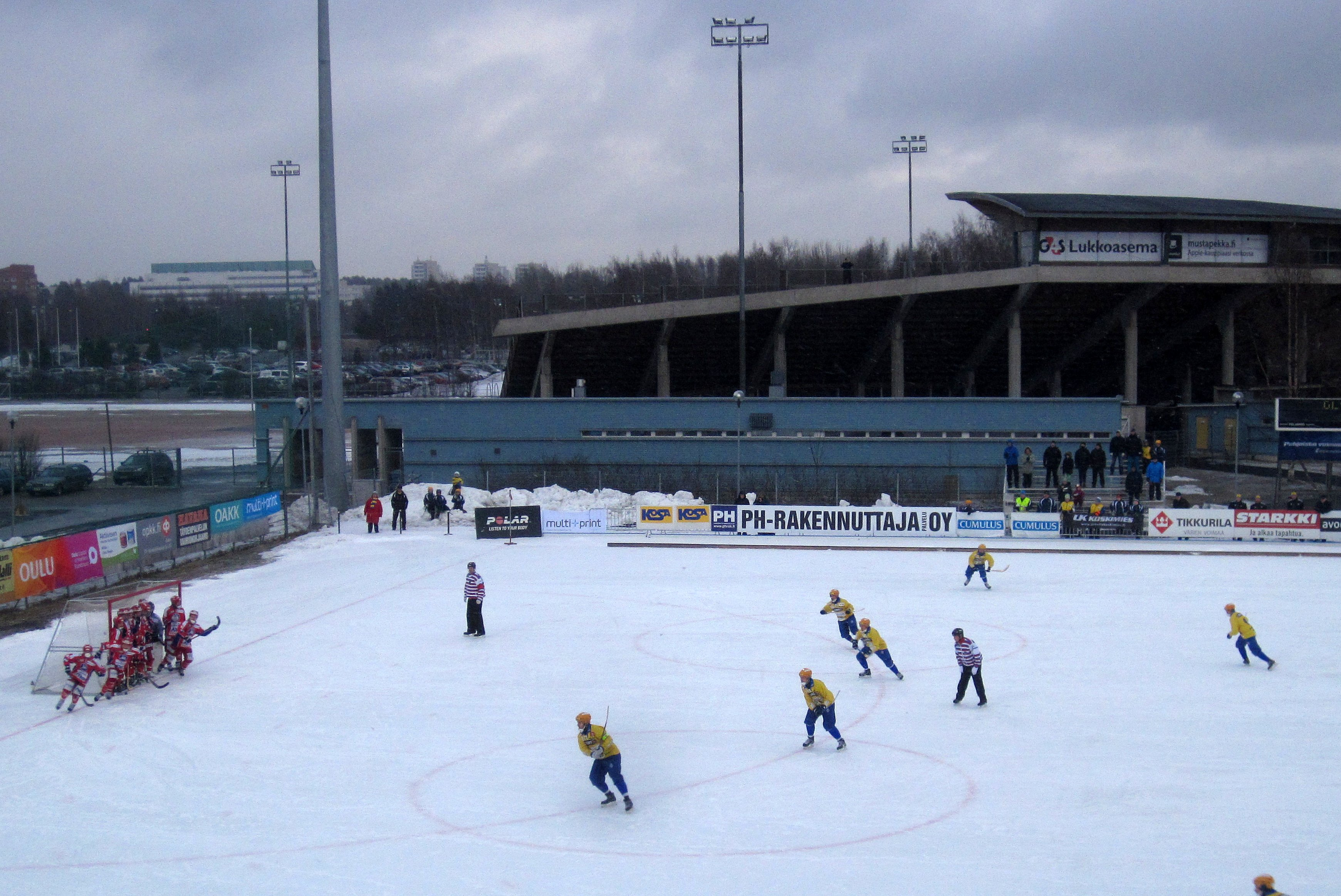
Oulun Luistinseura faced Jyväskylän Seudun Palloseura in the 2013–14 final in Oulu.

Bandy HJK - ViPS in Helsinki 7.2.1932.

Season	Champion	Runner-up	Third place
2024–25	JPS	Veiterä	Narukerä
2023–24	Veiterä	Akilles	JPS, Botnia-69
2022–23	Narukerä	Kampparit	Veiterä
2021–22	Veiterä	Akilles	Narukerä
2020–21	Akilles	Veiterä	Narukerä
2019–20	Akilles	Veiterä	JPS
2018–19	JPS	Veiterä	Kampparit
2017–18	Veiterä	Kampparit	Akilles
2016–17	Veiterä	Akilles	JPS
2015–16	Botnia-69	Akilles	Kampparit
2014–15	Kampparit	HIFK	Veiterä
2013–14	Luistinseura	JPS	Akilles
2012–13	HIFK	Narukerä	Kampparit
2011–12	Kampparit	Narukerä	HIFK
2010–11	HIFK	Kampparit	Narukerä
2009–10	HIFK	Luistinseura	Narukerä
2008–09	Luistinseura	HIFK	OPS
2007–08	Luistinseura	ToPV	WP 35
2006–07	ToPV	HIFK	Narukerä
2005–06	ToPV	Luistinseura	Narukerä
2004–05	ToPV	Narukerä	Luistinseura
2003–04	ToPV	Luistinseura	WP 35

== See also ==
- List of Finnish Bandy clubs
