= Riikka Sallinen =

Finnish ice hockey player (born 1973)

- Hockey Hall of Fame, 2022
- Born: 12 June 1973 (age 53) Jyväskylä, Finland
- Height: 1.63 m (5 ft 4 in)
- Weight: 60 kg (132 lb; 9 st 6 lb)
- Position: Forward
- Shot: Right
- Played for: EVU Vantaa; JYP Jyväskylä; DHC Lyss; Shakers Kerava; KalPa Kuopio; Limhamn HK; HV71; IF Troja/Ljungby
- Coached for: HV71
- National team: Finland
- Playing career: 1988–2003; 2013–2019
- Coaching career: 2019–2021
Medal record
Women's ice hockey
Representing Finland
Olympic Games
| Bronze medal – third place | 2018 Pyeongchang | Team |
| Bronze medal – third place | 1998 Nagano | Team |
World Championship
| Silver medal – second place | 2019 Finland |
| Bronze medal – third place | 2017 United States |
| Bronze medal – third place | 2015 Sweden |
| Bronze medal – third place | 1997 Canada |
| Bronze medal – third place | 1994 United States |
| Bronze medal – third place | 1992 Finland |
| Bronze medal – third place | 1990 Canada |
European Championships
| Gold medal – first place | 1989 West Germany |
| Gold medal – first place | 1993 Denmark |
| Gold medal – first place | 1995 Latvia |

Hanna-Riikka Sallinen (née Nieminen, previously Välilä; SAHL-lih-nen; born 12 June 1973) is a Finnish retired ice hockey, bandy, rinkball, and pesäpallo player. She is one of the most highly decorated players to have ever competed in international ice hockey.

Sallinen played sixteen seasons with the Finland women's national ice hockey team and earned two Olympic bronze medals, one World Championship silver and six bronze medals, and three European Championship gold medals. In 2007, Sallinen was one of the first two women inducted into the Finnish Hockey Hall of Fame, along with defenceman Marianne Ihalainen. She was inducted into the IIHF Hall of Fame on 21 May 2010 in Cologne, Germany as part of the World Championship festivities; she was only the fourth woman and the first European woman to receive this honor. She is currently the leading all-time European scorer in World Championships and Olympics.

Sallinen's bronze medal at the 2018 Olympics in PyeongChang made her the oldest player to ever win an Olympic medal in ice hockey, replacing her compatriot Teemu Selänne who set the record at the 2014 Winter Olympics after winning bronze in the men's ice hockey tournament at age 43. Sallinen was awarded the medal at age 44, twenty years after she first won an Olympic medal in the inaugural women's Olympic hockey tournament.

In 2022 she became the ninth woman player named to the Hockey Hall of Fame; she is the first woman not born in North America to be so honoured.

== Ice hockey playing career ==
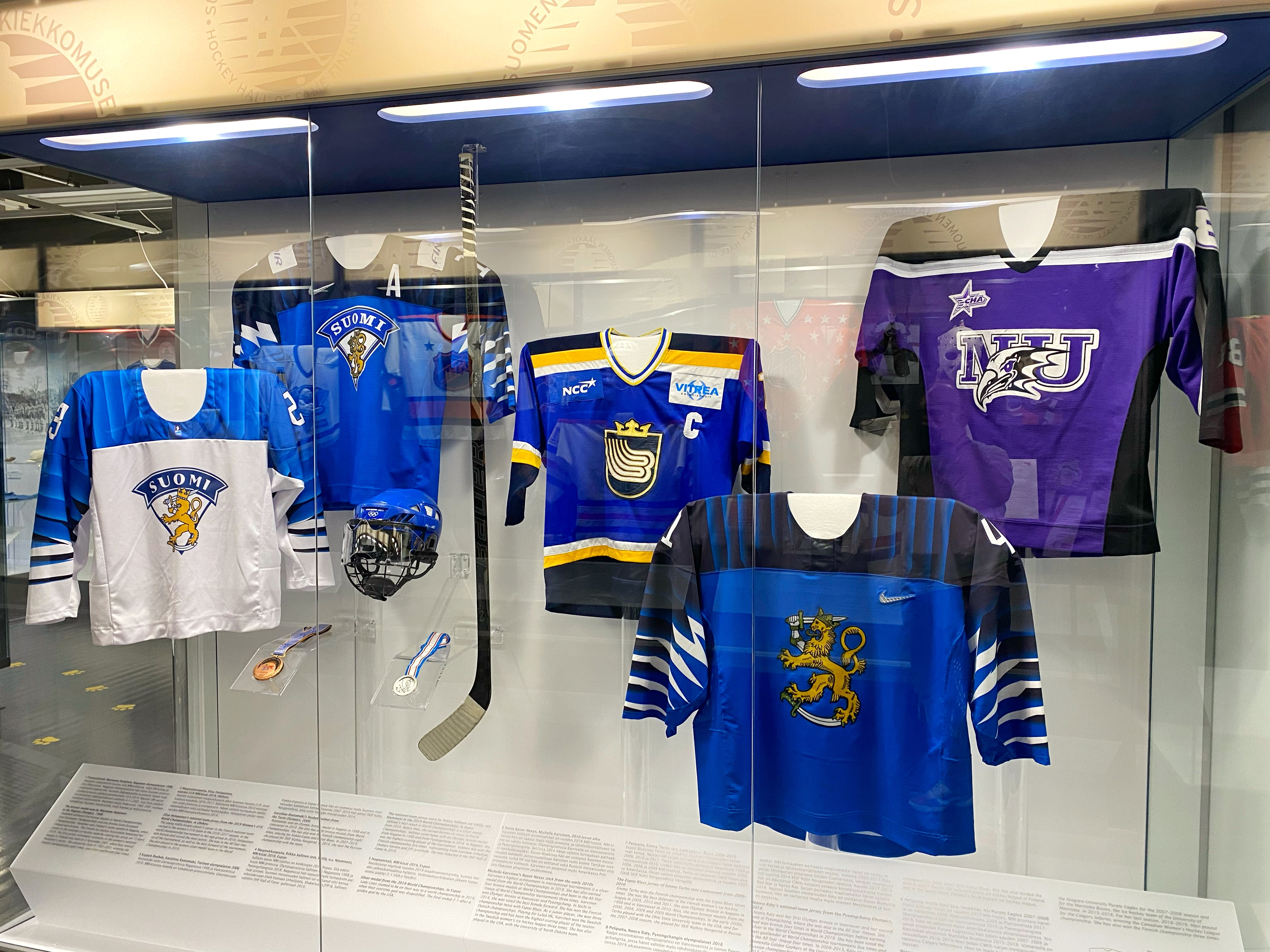
Riikka Sallinen's national team jersey from the 2019 IIHF Women's World Championship (white, left) is on display as part of the women's ice hockey artifacts at the Finnish Ice Hockey Museum.

Sallinen played eleven seasons in the Naisten SM-sarja and was a five time Finnish Champion, first in 1988–89 with Etelä-Vantaan Urheilijat (EVU), then in 1993–94 with the Keravan Shakers, and in 1996–97, 1997–98, and 2015–16 with JYP Jyväskylä Naiset. She scored 201 goals and notched 194 assists (395 points) in 135 regular season games, averaging 2.93 points per game across her Naisten SM-sarja career, and appeared in 41 Naisten SM-sarja playoff games, scoring 86 points, (36 goals and 50 assists).

In 2016, she joined HV71 in the SDHL. She would captain the team from 2017 to 2019, scoring a total of 119 points in 92 games. She was suspended for four games in the 2018-19 playoffs after bodychecking a Leksands IF player.

She announced her retirement from competition in April 2019, at age 46, shortly after achieving silver at the 2019 IIHF Women's World Championship.

=== International ice hockey career ===
Sallinen represented Finland at three IIHF Women's European Championships, eight IIHF World Women's Championships, and four Olympics. Over her international career she would score 109 goals, 95 assists for 204 points while accumulating only 24 PIMs.

She made her international debut at the 1989 Women's European Championship. She was also a member of Team Finland during the first IIHF-sanctioned international Women's World Ice Hockey Championship in 1990. Leading all players in scoring at the 1994 IIHF Women's World Championship, she was named the tournament's Best Forward. After leading all players in scoring at the 1997 IIHF Women's World Championship, she became the first woman to be named a top-3 forward in three consecutive World Championships.

In her first Olympics in 1998 she led the tournament in scoring, amassing 12 points (7 goals & 5 assists) in six games and leading the Finnish team to the bronze medal. Sallinen would also lead the Finnish national team to three European Championship titles and six IIHF World Women's Championship bronze medals and one silver.

In August 2013, the IIHF reported that she was attempting a comeback and in December 2013, following several matches in the Naisten SM-sarja, she was selected for the Finnish women's team for the Sochi Olympics. She made the Finnish Olympic team again for the 2018 Olympics, helping Finland to a bronze medal.

She scored 4 points in 7 games at the 2019 IIHF Women's World Championship as Finland won their first silver medal in history. During the tournament, she averaged 19:58 time-on-ice, second on the team. The logo for the Championship, held in Finland, was designed by Michelle Karvinen in tribute to her career.

== Rinkball career ==
In rinkball, Sallinen won the European Championship gold in 1989.

== Personal life ==
Sallinen was born Hanna-Riikka Nieminen on 12 June 1973 in Jyväskylä, Central Finland. She was raised in a sports-oriented home; her father and two older brothers were also successful athletes. Her father, Eero, was a Finnish Champion pesäpallo player in the 1960s. Lasse Nieminen, Sallinen's eldest brother, played nearly 500 games with JYP Jyväskylä in the Liiga and currently serves as assistant coach to the JYP U16 juniors team. Juha "Jussi" Nieminen, Sallinen's second eldest brother, played twelve seasons in the Superpesis with Jyväskylän Kiri.

Sallinen is a physical therapist by training and works in the public sector with disabled and permanently ill people, in addition to working with her husband in the family's pain management and rehabilitation practice.

Sallinen and former Liiga player Mika Välilä were married in 2002 and divorced in early 2018. Their two sons, Emil Välilä (born 2003) and Elis Välilä (born 2005), play on the U18 and U16 teams of the Tappara ice hockey club respectively, the same junior organization in which their father developed.

Sallinen and osteopath Petteri Sallinen married in late 2018. They have a physical therapy practice in Sweden, in which each of them takes responsibility for one-half of patient care; Petteri focuses on alleviating patients' pain and Riikka develops physical therapy regimens for rehabilitation. Petteri, a former film director, was previously married to actress and theater director Anu Hälvä; they divorced in early 2018, and have two children together.

== Ice hockey career statistics ==
=== Regular season and playoffs ===
| | | | Regular season | | | | | Playoffs |
| Season | Team | League | GP | G | A | Pts | PIM | GP | G | A | Pts | PIM |
|---|---|---|---|---|---|---|---|---|---|---|---|---|
| 1988–89 | EVU | SM-sarja | 6 | 19 | 7 | 26 | 2 | — | — | — | — | — |
| 1989–90 | JyP HT | I-div. | 4 | 5 | 3 | 8 | 0 | — | — | — | — | — |
| 1991–92 | JyP HT | I-div. | 10 | 41 | 3 | 44 | 2 | — | — | — | — | — |
| 1992–93 | SC Lyss | LKA | 17 | 50 | 30 | 80 | 0 | — | — | — | — | — |
| 1993–94 | Shakers | SM-sarja | 21 | 73 | 56 | 129 | 8 | 5 | 11 | 11 | 22 | 4 |
| 1994–95 | JyP HT | I-div. | 8 | 35 | 13 | 48 | 25 | — | — | — | — | — |
| 1995–96 | KalPa | SM-sarja | 10 | 10 | 8 | 18 | 0 | — | — | — | — | — |
| 1996–97 | JyP HT | SM-sarja | 24 | 26 | 38 | 64 | 0 | 6 | 3 | 5 | 8 | 4 |
| 1997–98 | JYP | SM-sarja | 12 | 13 | 8 | 21 | 2 | 6 | 2 | 8 | 10 | 0 |
| 1999–2000 | JYP | SM-sarja | 2 | 1 | 0 | 1 | 0 | — | — | — | — | — |
| 2000–01 | JyHC | SM-sarja | 9 | 10 | 9 | 19 | 6 | — | — | — | — | — |
| 2001–02 | JyHC | SM-sarja | 13 | 10 | 12 | 22 | 2 | 2 | 1 | 1 | 2 | 2 |
| 2002–03 | Limhamn HK | Div. 1 | — | — | — | — | — | 3 | 3 | 3 | 6 | 0 |
| 2003–2013 | Did not play |
| 2013–14 | JYP | SM-sarja | 13 | 7 | 12 | 19 | 18 | 8 | 5 | 11 | 16 | 12 |
| 2014–15 | JYP | SM-sarja | 14 | 12 | 25 | 37 | 8 | 7 | 5 | 7 | 12 | 4 |
| 2015–16 | JYP | SM-sarja | 11 | 20 | 19 | 39 | 6 | 6 | 5 | 5 | 10 | 2 |
| 2016–17 | HV71 | SDHL | 23 | 10 | 11 | 21 | 12 | 6 | 3 | 3 | 6 | 4 |
| 2016–17 | IF Troja/Ljungby | Div. 1 | 1 | 2 | 3 | 5 | 0 | — | — | — | — | — |
| 2017–18 | HV71 | SDHL | 36 | 15 | 32 | 47 | 24 | 2 | 1 | 1 | 2 | 2 |
| 2018–19 | HV71 | SDHL | 33 | 14 | 37 | 51 | 8 | 4 | 1 | 1 | 2 | 25 |
| SM-sarja totals | | | 135 | 201 | 194 | 395 | 52 | 41 | 36 | 50 | 86 | 28 |
| SDHL totals | | | 92 | 39 | 80 | 119 | 44 | 12 | 5 | 5 | 10 | 31 |

=== International ===
| Year | Team | Event | Result | GP | G | A | Pts | PIM |
|---|---|---|---|---|---|---|---|---|
| 1989 | Finland | EC | 1st place, gold medalist(s) | 5 | 9 | 2 | 11 | 2 |
| 1990 | Finland | WC | 3rd place, bronze medalist(s) | 5 | 8 | 2 | 10 | 4 |
| 1992 | Finland | WC | 3rd place, bronze medalist(s) | 5 | 6 | 2 | 8 | 0 |
| 1993 | Finland | EC | 1st place, gold medalist(s) | 3 | 2 | 2 | 4 | 0 |
| 1994 | Finland | WC | 3rd place, bronze medalist(s) | 5 | 4 | 8 | 13 | 4 |
| 1995 | Finland | EC | 1st place, gold medalist(s) | 5 | 9 | 14 | 23 | 2 |
| 1997 | Finland | WC | 3rd place, bronze medalist(s) | 5 | 5 | 5 | 10 | 0 |
| 1998 | Finland | OG | 3rd place, bronze medalist(s) | 6 | 7 | 5 | 12 | 4 |
| 2002 | Finland | OG | 4th | 5 | 0 | 3 | 3 | 2 |
| 2014 | Finland | OG | 5th | 6 | 1 | 4 | 5 | 0 |
| 2015 | Finland | WC | 3rd place, bronze medalist(s) | 6 | 6 | 0 | 6 | 0 |
| 2016 | Finland | WC | 4th | 6 | 1 | 5 | 6 | 0 |
| 2017 | Finland | WC | 3rd place, bronze medalist(s) | 6 | 1 | 2 | 3 | 2 |
| 2018 | Finland | OG | 3rd place, bronze medalist(s) | 6 | 4 | 1 | 5 | 0 |
| 2019 | Finland | WC | 2nd place, silver medalist(s) | 7 | 0 | 4 | 4 | 8 |
| Senior totals | | | | 81 | 63 | 59 | 123 | 28 |

== Awards and honours ==
=== Ice hockey ===
| Award | Year |
Finland
| Finnish Champion in Women's Ice Hockey | 1989 (EVU), 1994 (Shakers), 1997, 1998, 2016 (JYP) |
| Tiia Reima Award | 1993–94 (73 goals) |
| Marianne Ihalainen Award | 1993–94 (129 points), 1996–97 (64 points) |
| Suomen Jääkiekkoleijona; Hockey Hall of Fame Finland | 2007 |
| Karoliina Rantamäki Award | 2015–16 |
| President's Trophy | 2018 |
| Number retired by JYP Jyväskylä | 4 January 2020 |
International
| IIHF Women's World Championship Best Forward | 1990, 1994 |
| IIHF Women's World Championship All-Star Team | 1992, 1994, 1997 |
| IIHF Hall of Fame | 2010 |
| Hockey Hall of Fame | 2022 |

=== Other sports ===
| Award | Year |
Bandy
| Finnish Champion in Women's Bandy | 1989, 1990, 1991, 1992 (JPS) |
| Finnish Bandy Association Player of the Year | 1989, 1992 |
Pesäpallo
| Finnish Champion in Women's Pesäpallo | 1989 (Kiri), 1992, 1993 (LaVi) |
| Superpesis Player of the Year | 1989, 1992, 1993 |
| Superpesis Batting Queen | 1993, 1995 |
| Superpesis Most Hits | 1993, 1995 |
| Superpesis Most Runs | 1989, 1993 |
| Superpesis Golden Bat | 1993, 1995 |
| Superpesis Golden Mitt | 1993 |
Rinkball
| European Championship Gold Medal | 1989 |
| Finnish Champion in Women's Rinkball | 1989, 1990, 1992 (JPS), 1993, 1994, 1995, 1996 (TRIO 90) |

| Preceded by Patrik Laine | Winner of the President's trophy 2017–18 | Succeeded by Kaapo Kakko |
