= Vehkalammen kenttä =

Sports ground in Jyväskylä, Finland

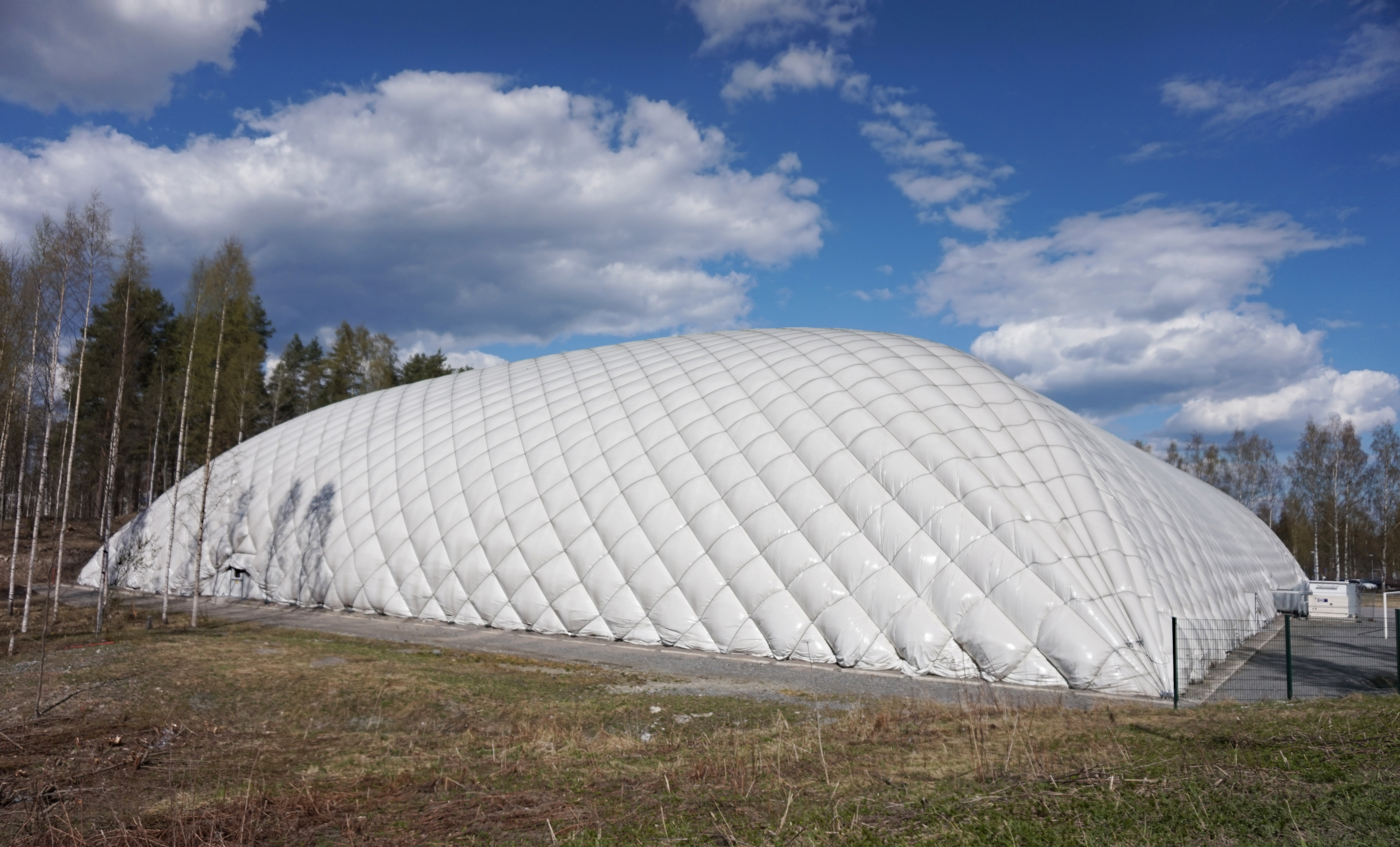
Vehkalampi football hall

Vehkalammen kenttä is a sports ground in Jyväskylä, in Central Finland. It is the home ground of bandy club Jyväskylän Seudun Palloseura.
