= List of Finnish bandy champions =

Finnish bandy champion is the title given to the team winning the play-off at the end of Bandyliiga, the highest bandy league in Finland.

Bandy was the first team sport, for which a Finnish championship was contested. This was in early 1908 (while the first Finnish championship in association football were played later the same year). The league and the championship are administered by Finland's Bandy Association.

Finnish Workers' Sports Federation had its own Finnish bandy championship tournament 1924–1955.

== Winners through the years ==
=== Men ===
| Year | Champion (gold medalist) | Runner-up (silver medalist) | Bronze medalist |
|---|---|---|---|
| 1908 | Polyteknikkojen Urheiluseura | IFK Helsingfors | Not awarded |
| 1909 | Polyteknikkojen Urheiluseura | IFK Helsingfors | Not awarded |
| 1910 | IFK Helsingfors | Polyteknikkojen Urheiluseura | Not awarded |
| 1911 | IFK Helsingfors | Viipurin IFK | Not awarded |
| 1912 | IFK Helsingfors | Viipurin SLU | Not awarded |
| 1913 | IFK Helsingfors | Viipurin Bandy & Jalkapalloseura | Not awarded |
| 1914 | Viipurin Bandy & Jalkapalloseura | IFK Helsingfors | Not awarded |
| 1915 | Viipurin Bandy & Jalkapalloseura | IFK Helsingfors | Not awarded |
| 1916 | Viipurin Bandy & Jalkapalloseura | IFK Helsingfors | Not awarded |
| 1917 | Viipurin Bandy & Jalkapalloseura | Kronohagens IF | Not awarded |
| 1918 | Not played because of the Finnish Civil War | | |
| 1919 | Viipurin Bandy & Jalkapalloseura | IFK Helsingfors | Not awarded |
| 1920 | Viipurin Bandy & Jalkapalloseura | Helsingin Palloseura | Not awarded |
| 1921 | Helsingin Jalkapalloklubi | Viipurin Bandy & Jalkapalloseura | Not awarded |
| 1922 | Viipurin Bandy & Jalkapalloseura | Kronohagens IF | Not awarded |
| 1923 | Helsingin Jalkapalloklubi | Viipurin Bandy & Jalkapalloseura | Not awarded |
| 1924 | Helsingin Jalkapalloklubi | Viipurin Sudet | Not awarded |
| 1925 | Viipurin Sudet | Helsingin Jalkapalloklubi | Not awarded |
| 1926 | Viipurin Sudet | Kronohagens IF | Not awarded |
| 1927 | Viipurin Sudet | Helsingin Jalkapalloklubi | Not awarded |
| 1928 | Helsingin Jalkapalloklubi | Viipurin Sudet | Not awarded |
| 1929 | Viipurin Sudet | IFK Helsingfors | Not awarded |
| 1930 | Viipurin Sudet | Kronohagens IF | Not awarded |
| 1931 | Viipurin Palloseura | Viipurin Sudet | Kronohagens IF |
| 1932 | Viipurin Sudet | Kronohagens IF | Viipurin Palloseura |
| 1933 | Viipurin Sudet | IFK Helsingfors | Viipurin Palloseura |
| 1934 | IFK Helsingfors | Viipurin Palloseura | Viipurin Sudet |
| 1935 | IFK Helsingfors | Viipurin Sudet | Borgå Akilles |
| 1936 | Viipurin Palloseura | IFK Helsingfors | Viipurin Sudet |
| 1937 | Helsingin Jalkapalloklubi | IFK Helsingfors | Viipurin Sudet |
| 1938 | IFK Helsingfors | Warkauden Pallo -35 | Helsingin Jalkapalloklubi |
| 1939 | IFK Helsingfors | Ylä-Vuoksen Palloseura | Warkauden Pallo -35 |
| 1940 | Not played because of the Finnish Winter War | | |
| 1941 | IFK Helsingfors | Viipurin Sudet | Helsingin Jalkapalloklubi |
| 1942 | Not played because of the Continuation War (Note: No official Finnish bandy championship was arranged in 1942, but an unofficial "war time league" was played. IFK Helsingfors won this.) | | |
| 1943 | Warkauden Pallo -35 | IFK Helsingfors | Not awarded |
| 1944 | IFK Helsingfors | Warkauden Pallo -35 | Not awarded |
| 1945 | Warkauden Pallo -35 | Oulun Palloseura | IFK Helsingfors |
| 1946 | Warkauden Pallo -35 | Helsingin Jalkapalloklubi | IFK Helsingfors |
| 1947 | Warkauden Pallo -35 | Oulun Palloseura | IFK Helsingfors |
| 1948 | Warkauden Pallo -35 | Oulun Palloseura | Lappeenrannan Urheilu-Miehet |
| 1949 | Lappeenrannan Urheilu-Miehet | Vasa IFK | Oulun Palloseura |
| 1950 | Warkauden Pallo -35 | Oulun Palloseura | Vasa IFK |
| 1951 | Veiterä Lappeenranta | Oulun Palloseura | Warkauden Pallo -35 |
| 1952 | Warkauden Pallo -35 | Oulun Palloseura | Veiterä Lappeenranta |
| 1953 | Oulun Palloseura | Veiterä Lappeenranta | Warkauden Pallo -35 |
| 1954 | Warkauden Pallo -35 | Veiterä Lappeenranta | Oulun Palloseura |
| 1955 | Veiterä Lappeenranta | Oulun Palloseura | Warkauden Pallo -35 |
| 1956 | Oulun Palloseura | Käpylän Urheilu-Veikot | Veiterä Lappeenranta |
| 1957 | Veiterä Lappeenranta | Oulun Palloseura | Käpylän Urheilu-Veikot |
| 1958 | Käpylän Urheilu-Veikot | Oulun Palloseura | Veiterä Lappeenranta |
| 1959 | Käpylän Urheilu-Veikot | Oulun Palloseura | Veiterä Lappeenranta |
| 1960 | Oulun Palloseura | Veiterä Lappeenranta | Käpylän Urheilu-Veikot |
| 1961 | Oulun Palloseura | Käpylän Urheilu-Veikot | Veiterä Lappeenranta |
| 1962 | Oulun Palloseura | Oulun Luistinseura | Käpylän Urheilu-Veikot |
| 1963 | Oulun Palloseura | Veitsiluodon Vastus | Warkauden Pallo -35 |
| 1964 | Oulun Palloseura | Vasa IFK | Oulun Luistinseura |
| 1965 | Warkauden Pallo -35 | IFK Helsingfors | Oulun Palloseura |
| 1966 | Warkauden Pallo -35 | Lappeenrannan Pallo | IFK Helsingfors |
| 1967 | Warkauden Pallo -35 | Oulun Luistinseura | Oulun Palloseura |
| 1968 | Mikkelin Palloilijat | Borgå Akilles | Warkauden Pallo -35 |
| 1969 | Veitsiluodon Vastus | Mikkelin Palloilijat | Warkauden Pallo -35 |
| 1970 | Oulun Luistinseura | Warkauden Pallo -35 | Mikkelin Palloilijat |
| 1971 | Warkauden Pallo -35 | Veitsiluodon Vastus | Oulun Luistinseura |
| 1972 | Veitsiluodon Vastus | Warkauden Pallo -35 | IFK Helsingfors |
| 1973 | Veitsiluodon Vastus | IFK Helsingfors | Oulun Luistinseura |
| 1974 | Veitsiluodon Vastus | Warkauden Pallo -35 | Oulun Luistinseura |
| 1975 | Oulun Luistinseura | IFK Helsingfors | Warkauden Pallo -35 |
| 1976 | Oulun Luistinseura | Warkauden Pallo -35 | Veitsiluodon Vastus |
| 1977 | Oulun Luistinseura | Veiterä Lappeenranta | Veitsiluodon Vastus |
| 1978 | IFK Helsingfors | Oulun Luistinseura | Borgå Akilles |
| 1979 | Oulun Luistinseura | Veiterä Lappeenranta | IFK Helsingfors |
| 1980 | Veiterä Lappeenranta | IFK Helsingfors | Veitsiluodon Vastus |
| 1981 | Borgå Akilles | Oulun Luistinseura | Lappeenrannan Veiterä |
| 1982 | Oulun Luistinseura | IFK Helsingfors | Borgå Akilles |
| 1983 | Oulun Luistinseura | IFK Helsingfors | Borgå Akilles |
| 1984 | Oulun Luistinseura | IFK Helsingfors | Borgå Akilles |
| 1985 | Borgå Akilles | Veitsiluodon Vastus | Oulun Luistinseura |
| 1986 | Oulun Luistinseura | Veiterä Lappeenranta | IFK Helsingfors |
| 1987 | IFK Helsingfors | Oulun Luistinseura | Akilles |
| 1988 | IFK Helsingfors | Veiterä Lappeenranta | Oulun Luistinseura |
| 1989 | Botnia-69 | Oulun Luistinseura | IFK Helsingfors |
| 1990 | Oulun Luistinseura | Botnia-69 | Warkauden Pallo -35 |
| 1991 | Oulun Luistinseura | Botnia-69 | IFK Helsingfors |
| 1992 | Botnia-69 | Warkauden Pallo -35 | Oulun Luistinseura |
| 1993 | Warkauden Pallo -35 | Botnia-69 | Veiterä Lappeenranta |
| 1994 | Warkauden Pallo -35 | Veiterä Lappeenranta | Oulun Luistinseura |
| 1995 | Warkauden Pallo -35 | Oulun Luistinseura | Botnia-69 |
| 1996 | Warkauden Pallo -35 | Tornion Palloveikot | Botnia-69 |
| 1997 | Botnia-69 | Tornion Palloveikot | Warkauden Pallo -35 |
| 1998 | IFK Helsingfors | Botnia-69 | Porin Narukerä |
| 1999 | Porin Narukerä | Tornion Palloveikot | Warkauden Pallo -35 |
| 2000 | Tornion Palloveikot | Oulun Luistinseura | IFK Helsingfors |
| 2001 | Oulun Luistinseura | Tornion Palloveikot | IFK Helsingfors |
| 2002 | Tornion Palloveikot | Oulun Luistinseura | Porin Narukerä |
| 2003 | Oulun Luistinseura | Tornion Palloveikot | Warkauden Pallo -35 |
| 2004 | Tornion Palloveikot | Oulun Luistinseura | Warkauden Pallo -35 |
| 2005 | Tornion Palloveikot | Porin Narukerä | Oulun Luistinseura |
| 2006 | Tornion Palloveikot | Oulun Luistinseura | Porin Narukerä |
| 2007 | Tornion Palloveikot | IFK Helsingfors | Porin Narukerä |
| 2008 | Oulun Luistinseura | Tornion Palloveikot | Warkauden Pallo -35 |
| 2009 | Oulun Luistinseura | IFK Helsingfors | Oulun Palloseura |
| 2010 | IFK Helsingfors | Oulun Luistinseura | Porin Narukerä |
| 2011 | IFK Helsingfors | Mikkelin Kampparit | Porin Narukerä |
| 2012 | Mikkelin Kampparit | Porin Narukerä | IFK Helsingfors |
| 2013 | IFK Helsingfors | Porin Narukerä | Mikkelin Kampparit |
| 2014 | Oulun Luistinseura | Jyväskylän Seudun Palloseura | Borgå Akilles |
| 2015 | Mikkelin Kampparit | IFK Helsingfors | Veiterä Lappeenranta |
| 2016 | Botnia-69 | Borgå Akilles | Mikkelin Kampparit |
| 2017 | Veiterä Lappeenranta | Borgå Akilles | Jyväskylän Seudun Palloseura |
| 2018 | Veiterä Lappeenranta | Mikkelin Kampparit | Akilles |
| 2019 | Jyväskylän Seudun Palloseura | Veiterä Lappeenranta | Mikkelin Kampparit |
| 2020 | Borgå Akilles | Veiterä Lappeenranta | Jyväskylän Seudun Palloseura |
| 2021 | Borgå Akilles | Veiterä Lappeenranta | Porin Narukerä |
| 2022 | Veiterä | Borgå Akilles | Porin Narukerä |
| 2023 | Porin Narukerä | Mikkelin Kampparit | Veiterä Lappeenranta |
| 2024 | Veiterä | Akilles | Jyväskylän Seudun Palloseura, Botnia-69 |
| 2025 | Jyväskylän Seudun Palloseura | Veiterä | Porin Narukerä |
| 2026 | Jyväskylän Seudun Palloseura | Veiterä | Botnia-69 |

=== Women ===
The first women's championships were only played in 1979. No women's championships were played 1993–2005.

== Titles ==
=== Men's titles per club ===
Helsingfors IFK (HIFK) has won the most titles as of 2019.

- 17: IFK Helsingfors
- 16: Warkauden Pallo -35
- 16: Oulun Luistinseura
- 14: Sudet
- 7: Oulun Palloseura
- 6: Tornion Palloveikot
- 6: Veiterä
- 5: Helsingin Jalkapalloklubi
- 5: Lappeenrannan Veiterä
- 4: Veitsiluodon Vastus
- 4: Botnia-69, Helsinki
- 3: Jyväskylän Seudun Palloseura
- 2: Porin Narukerä
- 2: Akilles, Porvoo
- 2: Polyteknikkojen Urheiluseura, Helsinki
- 2: Käpylän Urheilu-Veikot, Helsinki
- 2: Viipurin Palloseura
- 2: Mikkelin Kampparit
- 1: Mikkelin Palloilijat
- 1: Lappeenrannan Urheilu-Miehet

=== Men's and women's titles the same year ===
| Double Titles | Club | Years |
|---|---|---|
| 2 | Oulun Luistinseura | 1982, 1983 |
| 2 | IFK Helsingfors | 1987, 2011 |

== Final matches for the Finnish Workers' Sports Federation 1924–1955 ==
- 1924: Helsingin Jyry - Tampereen Kisa-Toverit 6-2
- 1925: Not played
- 1926: Helsingin Kullervo - Helsingin Jyry 4-3
- 1927: Töölön Vesa - Helsingin Kullervo 7-4 jatkoajan jälkeen
- 1928: Töölön Vesa - Helsingin Jyry 2-1
- 1929: Töölön Vesa - Helsingin Kullervo 4-3
- 1930: Talikkalan Toverit - Helsingin Kullervo 3-2
- 1931: Helsingin Kullervo - Töölön Vesa 2-1
- 1932: Talikkalan Toverit - Varkauden Tarmo 4-3 jatkoajan jälkeen
- 1933: Helsingin Kullervo - Sorvalin Veikot 1-0
- 1934: Töölön Vesa - Varkauden Tarmo 1-1, 5-4 uusintaottelussa
- 1935: Talikkalan Toverit - Helsingin Kullervo 5-1
- 1936: Maarian Pyrkivä - Talikkalan Toverit 2-1
- 1937: Maarian Pyrkivä - Kotkan Työväen Palloilijat 7-3
- 1938: Maarian Pyrkivä - Sorvalin Veikot 3-2
- 1939: Maarian Pyrkivä - Sorvalin Veikot 4-1
- 1940: Not played
- 1941: Maarian Pyrkivä - Talikkalan Toverit 5-1
- 1942–1944: Not played
- 1945: Turun Pyrkivä - Warkauden Työväen Palloilijat 3-1
- 1946: Viipurin Toverit - Warkauden Työväen Palloilijat 3-2
- 1947: Porin Pallo-Toverit - Turun Pyrkivä 3-0
- 1948: Turun Pyrkivä - Helsingin Ponnistus 6-0
- 1949: Turun Pyrkivä - Warkauden Työväen Palloilijat 3-2 jatkoajan jälkeen
- 1950: Turun Pyrkivä - Helsingin Jyry 5-1
- 1951: Turun Pyrkivä - Helsingin Jyry 3-2
- 1952: Turun Pyrkivä - Imatran Pallo 1-0 ja.
- 1953: Oulun Työväen Palloilijat - Savonlinnan Työväen Palloseura 8-0
- 1954: Oulun Työväen Palloilijat - Helsingin Jyry 2-1
- 1955: 1) Oulun Työväen Palloilijat 2) Helsingin Jyry 3) Lappeenrannan Pallo-Toverit - round-robin league.

== Finnish champions vs. Finnish Workers champions 1947–1953 ==
Final matches between the official Finnish champions and Finnish Workers' Sports Federation's bandy champions 1947–1953. 1947–1953: 1947 Porin Pallo-Toverit, 1948–1952 Turun Pyrkivä and 1953 Oulun Työväen Palloilijat.. .

== See also ==
- Bandyliiga

== Sources ==
- Voitto Raatikainen: Talviurheilun sankarit, Tulos- ja tilastoliite s.460
- MMM 1981 s.445
- Urheilumme Kasvot 3 Palloilu
- Martti Jukola: Urheilun Pikku Jättiläinen, 1951
