= Suomi-sarja (bandy) =

- Sport: Bandy
- Country: Finland

Suomi-sarja is the second tier league for bandy in Finland. The league is under Bandyliiga.

== Teams ==
- HIFK/2
- Uleåborg IFK
- Veiterä/2
- Lennex BK
- Vesta
- Kampparit/2
- Kampparit/SS
- JPS/2

== See also ==
- List of Finnish Bandy clubs
