= Oulunkylä Ice Rink =

Sports venue in Helsinki, Finland

Coordinates: 60.2343°N 24.9593°E

- Ogeli
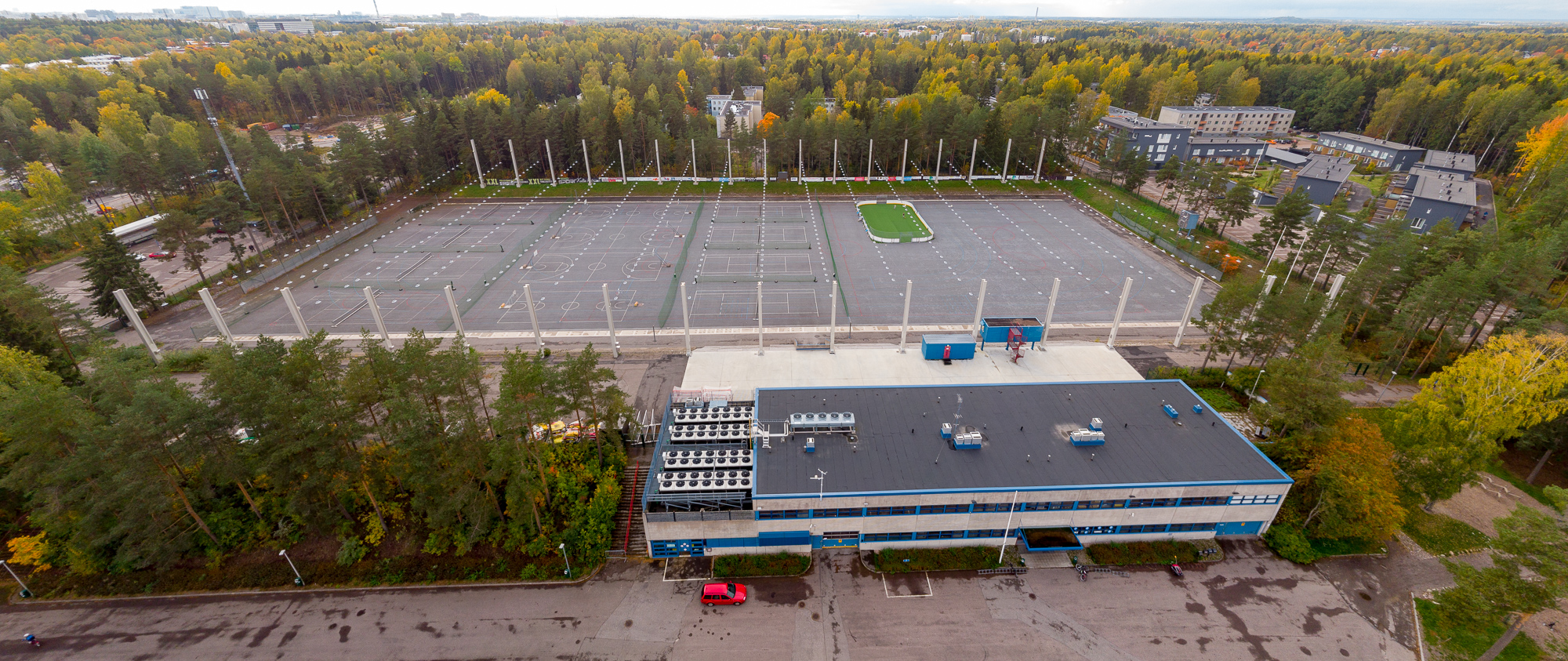
- The field at summer
- Interactive map of Oulunkylä Ice Rink
- Location: Oulunkylä, Finland

Construction
- Opened: 1977

Tenant
- Botnia-69

Oulunkylä Ice Rink, Oulunkylän tekojäärata or Oulunkylä artificial skating rink consists of an indoor ice hockey-sized rink and an outdoor bandy field in Oulunkylä, Helsinki, Finland. It is also used for figure skating, speed skating, and recreational skating. It is the home arena for Botnia-69, and was the venue for the final games at the 1983 Bandy World Championship as well as the 1991 tournament.

Oulunkylä Ice Rink was the first arena where a designated final game of a bandy world championship was played (before 1983, the world championships were always decided on round-robin results) and the first arena to ever have hosted the bandy world championship final twice. In that second final, the Soviet Union national team played its last ever match.

Preceded by N/A	Bandy World Championship; Final Venue; 1983	Succeeded by Valle Hovin; Oslo, Norway
Preceded by Olympic Stadium; Moscow, Russia	Bandy World Championship; Final Venue; 1991	Succeeded by Hamar Olympic Hall; Hamar, Norway
