= 1994 IIHF Women's World Championship =

Tournament details
- Host country: United States
- Venue: Lake Placid (in 1 host city)
- Dates: April 11–17, 1994
- Opened by: Bill Clinton
- Teams: 8

Final positions
- Champions: Canada (3rd title)
- Runners-up: United States
- Third place: Finland
- Fourth place: China

Tournament statistics
- Games played: 20
- Goals scored: 185 (9.25 per game)
- Scoring leader: (Finland) Riikka Nieminen (4+9=13pts)

The 1994 IIHF Women's World Championships was held April 11–17, 1994, at the Herb Brooks Arena in Lake Placid, New York, in the United States. The Team Canada won their third consecutive gold medal at the World Championships defeating the United States. Finland picked up their third consecutive bronze medal, with a win over semifinal debutants, China.

== Qualification ==
The tournament was held between eight teams. Canada and the United States received automatic qualification for the tournament. In addition, the top five teams from the 1993 European Championship would be joined by the winner of the 1994 Asian Qualification Tournament.

- Canada - Automatically Qualified
- China - Winner - 1994 Asian Qualification Tournament
- Finland - Winner - 1993 European Championship
- Germany - 4th place - 1993 European Championship
- Norway - 3rd Place - 1993 European Championship
- Switzerland - 5th place - 1993 European Championship
- Sweden - 2nd Place - - 1993 European Championship
- United States - Automatically Qualified

=== Asian Qualification Tournament (Japan) ===
11 March 1994	Japan	2-6	China

12 March 1994	Japan	1-7	China

== Venue ==
The tournament took place at the Herb Brooks Arena in Lake Placid, New York, in the United States.

Lake Placid, New York, United States
Host Venue	Details
Herb Brooks Arena Herb Brooks Arena interior, 2010	Location: (United States) Lake Placid, New York, in the United States; Broke ground: Spring 1975; Opened: September 20, 1979 Capacity:

== Final tournament ==
The eight participating teams were divided up into two seeded groups as below. The teams played each other once in a single round robin format. The top two teams from the group proceeded to the Final Round, while the remaining teams played in the consolation round.

Attendance was not recorded for the tournament, except for the gold medal game.

== First round ==
=== Group A ===
==== Standings ====
Pos	Team	Pld	W	D	L	GF	GA	GD	Pts	Qualification
1	Canada	3	3	0	0	27	3	+24	6	Advanced to Final round
2	China	3	1	1	1	13	12	+1	3	Advanced to Final round
3	Sweden	3	1	1	1	9	13	−4	3	Sent to Consolation round
4	Norway	3	0	0	3	2	23	−21	0	Sent to Consolation round

Source: Hockey Canada

==== Results ====
All times local

April 11, 1994; 2:00 pm	Sweden	3 – 1	Norway	Pad 1932, Lake Placid, New York

April 11, 1994; 4:00 pm	Canada	7 – 1	China	Pad 1980, Lake Placid, New York

April 12, 1994; 3:00 pm	Sweden	4 – 4	China	Pad 1980, Lake Placid, New York

April 12, 1994; 7:00 pm	Norway	0 – 12	Canada	Pad 1980, Lake Placid, New York

April 14, 1994; 3:00 pm	Canada	8 – 2	Sweden	Pad 1980, Lake Placid, New York

April 14, 1994; 7:00 pm	China	8 – 1 (2 - 0, 1 - 0, 3 - 1)	Norway	Pad 1932, Lake Placid, New York

=== Group B ===
==== Standings ====
Pos	Team	Pld	W	D	L	GF	GA	GD	Pts	Qualification
1	United States	3	3	0	0	24	1	+23	6	Advanced to Final round
2	Finland	3	2	0	1	31	3	+28	4	Advanced to Final round
3	Switzerland	3	1	0	2	2	20	−18	2	Sent to Consolation round
4	Germany	3	0	0	3	2	35	−33	0	Sent to Consolation round

Source: Hockey Canada

==== Results ====
All times local

April 11, 1994; 2:00 pm	Finland	17 – 1	Germany	Pad 1932, Lake Placid, New York

April 11, 1994; 8:00 pm	United States	6 – 0	Switzerland	Pad 1980, Lake Placid, New York

April 12, 1994; 4:00 pm	Finland	13 – 0	Switzerland	Pad 1932, Lake Placid, New York

April 12, 1994; 8:00 pm	Germany	0 – 16	United States	Pad 1932, Lake Placid, New York

April 14, 1994; 1:00 pm	Germany	1 – 2	Switzerland	Pad 1932, Lake Placid, New York

April 14, 1994; 7:00 pm	United States	2 – 1	Finland	Pad 1980, Lake Placid, New York

== Playoff round ==
=== Consolation round 5–8 place ===
April 16, 1994; 8:00 pm	Sweden	7 – 1	Germany	Pad 1980, Lake Placid, New York

April 16, 1994; 8:00 pm	Norway	7 – 4	Switzerland	Pad 1932, Lake Placid, New York

=== Consolation round 7–8 place ===
April 17, 1994; 9:00 am	Switzerland	4 – 3	Germany	Pad 1932, Lake Placid, New York

=== Consolation round 5–6 place ===
April 17, 1994; 1:00 pm	Sweden	6 – 3	Norway	Pad 1932, Lake Placid, New York

=== Final round ===
Semi finals 15 April 1994
A1	Canada	4
B2	Finland	1
B1	United States	14
A2	China	3

Finals; 17 April 1994
Canada	6
United States	3
Bronze Medal Game
Finland	8
China	1

=== Semifinals ===
April 15, 1994; 5:00 pm	Canada	4 – 1	Finland	Pad 1980, Lake Placid, New York

April 15, 1994	United States	14 – 3	China	Pad 1980, Lake Placid, New York

=== Match for third place ===
April 17, 1994; 11:15 am	Finland	8 – 1	China	Pad 1980, Lake Placid, New York

=== Final ===
April 17, 1994	Canada	6 – 3	United States	Pad 1980, Lake Placid, New York; Attendance: 3,198

Referee: Sandra Dombrowski

== Champions ==
1994 IIHF World Women Championship winners

Canada
3rd title

== Scoring leaders ==
Player	GP	G	A	Pts
(Finland) Riikka Nieminen	5	4	9	13
(Canada) Danielle Goyette	5	9	3	12
(United States) Karyn Bye	5	6	6	12
(United States) Cammi Granato	5	5	7	12
(China) Liu Hongmei	5	8	3	11
(Finland) Tiia Reima	5	7	4	11
(Finland) Sari Krooks	5	3	7	10
(United States) Stephanie O'Sullivan	5	3	7	10
(Finland) Hanna Teerijoki	5	5	4	9
(United States) Gretchen Ulion	5	5	4	9

== Goaltending leaders ==
(minimum 40% team's total ice time)

Player	GPI	Mins	GA	SOG	SV%	GAA
(Finland) Liisa-Maria Sneck	4	220	7	85	91.8	1.91
(United States) Kelly Dyer	2	129	3	24	87.5	1.50
(Canada) Manon Rhéaume	4	209	6	44	86.4	1.72
(Switzerland) Patricia Sautter	3	180	10	139	92.8	3.33
(United States) Erin Whitten	3	180	7	52	86.4	2.33

== Final standings ==
Rk.	Team
1st place, gold medalist(s)	Canada
2nd place, silver medalist(s)	United States
3rd place, bronze medalist(s)	Finland
4.	China
5.	Sweden
6.	Norway
7.	Switzerland
8.	Germany

== Directorate Awards ==
- Goalie: Erin Whitten (United States)
- Defender: Geraldine Heaney (Canada)
- Forward: Riikka Nieminen, (Finland)

The international media voted on the tournament all-star team at the conclusion of the event. The following players were named:

Position	Player	Team
G	Manon Rhéaume	Canada
D	Therese Brisson	Canada
D	Kelly O'Leary	United States
F	Riikka Nieminen	Finland
F	Danielle Goyette	Canada
F	Karyn Bye	United States
