= Borgå Bollplan =

Sports venue in Porvoo, Finland

Coordinates: 60.39197°N 25.67355°E

Borgå Bollplan (Finnish: Porvoon pallokenttä, lit. 'Porvoo Ball Ground') is a sports arena in Porvoo, Finland. It is the homeground of Borgå Akilles sports club and is used for association football in the summer and bandy in the winter time.
