= Borgå Akilles =

Finnish sports club

- Full name: Borgå Akilles Fotboll
- Nickname(s): Akilles, De Gröna (The Green Ones), Killen (lads)
- Founded: 1902
- Ground: Borgå Bollplan; Porvoo; Finland
- Capacity: Unknown
- Manager: Johan Britschgi
- League: Kolmonen
Home colours	Away colours

Borgå Akilles (Finnish: Porvoon Akilles), or more commonly just Akilles, is a bilingual Finnish sports club from the city of Porvoo (Swedish Borgå). Akilles, named for Achilles in ancient Greek mythology, was founded in 1902 and is one of the oldest active football clubs in Finland.

In Finland the club is mostly known for bandy. It plays in the highest division, Bandyliiga. It became Finnish champions in 1981, 1985, 2020 and 2021 and won the Finnish Cup in 2019.

The football team won promotion to the Finnish Third Division in 2006. The club also has active sections in cycling, track and field, handball, orienteering, skiing, and fitness sport.

== Results in football ==
Season to Season

Season	Level	Division	Section	Administration	Position	Movements
1935	Tier 2	B-Sarja (Second Division)	West Group	Finnish FA (Suomen Palloliitto)	6th	
1936	Tier 2	Itä-Länsi-sarja (Second Division)	West League	Finnish FA (Suomen Palloliitto)	4th	
1937	Tier 2	Itä-Länsi-sarja (Second Division)	West League	Finnish FA (Suomen Palloliitto)	4th	
1938	Tier 2	Itä-Länsi-sarja (Second Division)	West League, South Group	Finnish FA (Suomen Palloliitto)	3rd	
1939	Tier 2	Itä-Länsi-sarja (Second Division)	West League, Group 1	Finnish FA (Suomen Palloliitto)	2nd	
1940-41	Tier 2	B-Sarja (Second Division)		Finnish FA (Suomen Palloliitto)	5th	
1942-44						Did not participate
1945	Tier 2	Suomensarja (Second Division)	Group 2	Finnish FA (Suomen Palloliitto)	8th	Relegated
1945-46	Tier 3	Maakuntasarja (Third Division)	Helsinki Group II	Finnish FA (Suomen Pallolitto)	2nd	
1946-47	Tier 3	Maakuntasarja (Third Division)	Helsinki Group II	Finnish FA (Suomen Pallolitto)	1st	Promotion Playoff - Promoted
1947-48	Tier 2	Suomensarja (Second Division)	South Group	Finnish FA (Suomen Palloliitto)	8th	Relegated
1948	Tier 3	Maakuntasarja (Third Division)	South Group A	Finnish FA (Suomen Pallolitto)	4th	
1949	Tier 3	Maakuntasarja (Third Division)	South Group A	Finnish FA (Suomen Pallolitto)	3rd	
1950	Tier 3	Maakuntasarja (Third Division)	West Group A	Finnish FA (Suomen Pallolitto)	3rd	
1951	Tier 3	Maakuntasarja (Third Division)	South Group B	Finnish FA (Suomen Pallolitto)	6th	Relegated
1952	Tier 4	Piirisarja (Fourth Division)		Keski-Uusimaa District(SPL Keski-Uusimaa)		Promotion Playoff - Promoted
1953	Tier 3	Maakuntasarja (Third Division)	South Group B	Finnish FA (Suomen Pallolitto)	5th	
1954	Tier 3	Maakuntasarja (Third Division)	Central Group IV	Finnish FA (Suomen Pallolitto)	2nd	
1955	Tier 3	Maakuntasarja (Third Division)	South Group I	Finnish FA (Suomen Pallolitto)	1st	Promotion Playoff
1956	Tier 3	Maakuntasarja (Third Division)	South Group II	Finnish FA (Suomen Pallolitto)	7th	Relegated
1957	Tier 4	Aluesarja (Fourth Division)	Group 3	Finnish FA(Suomen Palloliitto)	2nd	
1958	Tier 4	Aluesarja (Fourth Division)	Group 1	Finnish FA(Suomen Palloliitto)	1st	
1959	Tier 3	Maakuntasarja (Third Division)	Uusimaa	Finnish FA (Suomen Pallolitto)	3rd	
1960	Tier 3	Maakuntasarja (Third Division)	Uusimaa & Kymenlaakso	Finnish FA (Suomen Pallolitto)	3rd	
1961	Tier 3	Maakuntasarja (Third Division)	Group 4	Finnish FA (Suomen Pallolitto)	1st	Promoted
1962	Tier 2	Suomensarja (Second Division)	East Group	Finnish FA (Suomen Palloliitto)	11th	Relegated
1963	Tier 3	Maakuntasarja (Third Division)	Group 5	Finnish FA (Suomen Pallolitto)	2nd	
1964	Tier 3	Maakuntasarja (Third Division)	Group 2	Finnish FA (Suomen Pallolitto)	2nd	
1965	Tier 3	Maakuntasarja (Third Division)	Group 1	Finnish FA (Suomen Pallolitto)	1st	Promoted
1966	Tier 2	Suomensarja (Second Division)	East Group	Finnish FA (Suomen Palloliitto)	5th	
1967	Tier 2	Suomensarja (Second Division)	East Group	Finnish FA (Suomen Palloliitto)	10th	
1968	Tier 2	Suomensarja (Second Division)	East Group	Finnish FA (Suomen Palloliitto)	5th	
1969	Tier 2	Suomensarja (Second Division)	East Group	Finnish FA (Suomen Palloliitto)	10th	
1970	Tier 3	III Divisioona (Third Division)	Group 5	Finnish FA (Suomen Pallolitto)	3rd	
1971	Tier 3	III Divisioona (Third Division)	Group 4	Finnish FA (Suomen Pallolitto)	4th	
1972	Tier 3	III Divisioona (Third Division)	Group 5	Finnish FA (Suomen Pallolitto)	1st	Promoted
1973	Tier 3	II Divisioona (Second Division)	East Group	Finnish FA (Suomen Pallolitto)	11th	Relegated
1974	Tier 4	III Divisioona (Third Division)	Group 1	Finnish FA(Suomen Palloliitto)	6th	
1975	Tier 4	III Divisioona (Third Division)	Group 1	Finnish FA(Suomen Palloliitto)	3rd	
1976	Tier 4	III Divisioona (Third Division)	Group 1	Finnish FA(Suomen Palloliitto)	3rd	
1977	Tier 4	III Divisioona (Third Division)	Group 1	Finnish FA(Suomen Palloliitto)	2nd	
1978	Tier 4	III Divisioona (Third Division)	Group 1	Finnish FA(Suomen Palloliitto)	3rd	
1979	Tier 4	III Divisioona (Third Division)	Group 1	Finnish FA(Suomen Palloliitto)	4th	
1980	Tier 4	III Divisioona (Third Division)	Group 1	Finnish FA(Suomen Palloliitto)	7th	
1981	Tier 4	III Divisioona (Third Division)	Group 1	Finnish FA(Suomen Palloliitto)	7th	
1982	Tier 4	III Divisioona (Third Division)	Group 1	Finnish FA(Suomen Palloliitto)	3rd	
1983	Tier 4	III Divisioona (Third Division)	Group 1	Finnish FA(Suomen Palloliitto)	5th	
1984	Tier 4	III Divisioona (Third Division)	Group 6	Finnish FA(Suomen Palloliitto)	3rd	
1985	Tier 4	III Divisioona (Third Division)	Group 1	Finnish FA(Suomen Palloliitto)	4th	
1986	Tier 4	III Divisioona (Third Division)	Group 1	Finnish FA(Suomen Palloliitto)	5th	
1987	Tier 4	III Divisioona (Third Division)	Group 1	Finnish FA(Suomen Palloliitto)	9th	
1988	Tier 4	III Divisioona (Third Division)	Group 1	Finnish FA(Suomen Palloliitto)	11th	Relegated
1989	Tier 5	IV Divisioona (Fourth Division)		Keski-Uusimaa District (SPL Keski-Uusimaa)		Promoted
1990	Tier 4	III Divisioona (Third Division)	Group 6	Finnish FA(Suomen Palloliitto)	7th	
1991	Tier 4	III Divisioona (Third Division)	Group 1	Finnish FA(Suomen Palloliitto)	11th	Relegated
1992	Tier 5	IV Divisioona (Fourth Division)	Group 1	Helsinki District (SPL Helsinki)	3rd	
1993	Tier 5	Nelonen (Fourth Division)	Group 1	Helsinki District (SPL Helsinki)	1st	Promoted
1994	Tier 4	Kolmonen (Third Division)	Group 2	Finnish FA(Suomen Palloliitto)	9th	
1995	Tier 4	Kolmonen (Third Division)	Group 2	Finnish FA(Suomen Palloliitto)	6th	
1996	Tier 4	Kolmonen (Third Division)	Group 1	Finnish FA(Suomen Palloliitto)	9th	
1997	Tier 4	Kolmonen (Third Division)	Group 2	Finnish FA(Suomen Palloliitto)	12th	Relegated
1998-2000						
2001	Tier 7	Kutonen (Sixth Division)	Group 6	Uusimaa District (SPL Uusimaa)	1st	Promoted
2002	Tier 6	Vitonen (Fifth Division)	Group 2	Uusimaa District (SPL Uusimaa)	6th	
2003	Tier 6	Vitonen (Fifth Division)	Group 2	Uusimaa District (SPL Uusimaa)	6th	
2004	Tier 6	Vitonen (Fifth Division)	Group 3	Uusimaa District (SPL Uusimaa)	1st	Promoted
2005	Tier 5	Nelonen (Fourth Division)	Group 2	Uusimaa District (SPL Uusimaa)	10th	
2006	Tier 5	Nelonen (Fourth Division)	Group 2	Uusimaa District (SPL Uusimaa)	1st	Promoted
2007	Tier 4	Kolmonen (Third Division)	Group 3	Helsinki & Uusimaa(SPL Helsinki)	10th	
2008	Tier 4	Kolmonen (Third Division)	Group 2	Helsinki & Uusimaa(SPL Helsinki)	12th	Relegated
2009	Tier 5	Nelonen (Fourth Division)	Group 2	Uusimaa District (SPL Uusimaa)	10th	Relegated
2010	Tier 6	Vitonen (Fifth Division)	Group 4	Uusimaa District (SPL Uusimaa)	2nd	Promoted
2011	Tier 5	Nelonen (Fourth Division)	Group 2	Uusimaa District (SPL Uusimaa)	3rd	Promoted
2012	Tier 4	Kolmonen (Third Division)	Group 1	Helsinki & Uusimaa(SPL Helsinki)	8th	
2013	Tier 4	Kolmonen (Third Division)	Group 2	Helsinki & Uusimaa(SPL Helsinki)	11th	Relegated
2014	Tier 5	Nelonen (Fourth Division)	Group 2	Uusimaa District (SPL Uusimaa)	2nd	Promotion Group 2nd - Promoted
2015	Tier 4	Kolmonen (Third Division)	Group 3	Helsinki & Uusimaa(SPL Helsinki)	10th	
2016	Tier 4	Kolmonen (Third Division)	Group 2	Helsinki & Uusimaa(SPL Helsinki)	12th	Relegated
2017	Tier 5	Nelonen (Fourth Division)	Group 2	Uusimaa District (SPL Uusimaa)	9th	
2018	Tier 5	Nelonen (Fourth Division)	Group 2	Uusimaa District (SPL Uusimaa)	10th	
2019	Tier 5	Nelonen (Fourth Division)	Group 4	Uusimaa District (SPL Uusimaa)	4th	

- 13 seasons in Suomensarja
- 20 seasons in II Divisioona
- 30 seasons in Kolmonen
- 11 seasons in Nelonen
- 4 seasons in Vitonen
- 1 season in Kutonen

== Official homepage ==
- Borgå Akilles official website (in Finnish)
- Borgå Akilles history (in Finnish)
