= HIFK Bandy =

HIFK
- City: Helsinki, Finland
- League: Bandyliiga
- Founded: 1907; 119 years ago
- Home arena: Kallio Ice Rink
Home colours	Away colours

HIFK (Helsingfors Idrottsföreningen Kamraterna) Bandy are a bandy club from Helsinki, Finland. HIFK Bandy was founded in 1907 and it is one of the oldest bandy clubs in Finland. HIFK are also the most successful bandy club with 17 championship titles. In 1988 they were European Cup runners-up. HIFK Bandy currently plays in Bandyliiga, the premier bandy league in Finland.

== History ==
HIFK Bandy was formed in 1907 as a bandy section of HIFK sports club formed in 1897. HIFK competed in the very first Finnish bandy championships in the winter of 1908. The team fared well in the early years of the competition winning their first title in 1910 and then again in 1911, 1912 and 1913. In the 1930s HIFK were again in top form gathering 3 more titles within 10 years. During war years of Second World War the team grabbed the top position in 1941 and 1944, along with victories in the unofficial wartime league of 1940 and 1942.

After the war HIFK found themselves in a slump and were relegated from Bandyliiga and spent five years in the Suomisarja, a second-tier bandy league. By the 1970s, things were back in shape with the construction of Oulunkylä artificial ice rink which was used for training and HIFK grabbed the title again in 1978. During this time, HIFK developed a healthy rivalry with local Botnia-69 who they competed against in front of thousands of spectators who had come to watch the two teams from Helsinki clash. In the late 80s HIFK struck gold again, winning the title twice in 1988 and 1989. In the following years many older players retired and HIFK was forced to rebuild itself from the ground up.

The rejuvenated team grabbed a their first title in 1998 but had to mature and wait until the late 2000s to find their top form again. The prize came eventually and HIFK won their first titles of the 21st century in 2010 and 2011. In 2013 HIFK beat Narukerä from Pori in the final by a score of 3-1 - making the team most successful bandy club in Finland with 17 titles.

HIFK placed second in 2014-15 season after losing to Mikkelin Kampparit 6-3 in the final, played on HIFK's home ground.

== Honours ==
- Bandyliiga championship titles: 17
  - 1910, 1911, 1912, 1913, 1934, 1935, 1938, 1939, 1941, 1944, 1978 1987, 1988, 1998, 2010, 2011, 2013
- Suomen Cup titles: 2
  - 1990, 1992
