= Tornion Palloveikot =

- City: Tornio, Finland
- Founded: 1935; 91 years ago

Tornion Palloveikot, Torneå PV or ToPV is a Finnish sports club in Tornio, founded in 1935. The club is mainly active playing bandy but also floorball and used to have a section for association football too.

The club's home games are nowadays played in Gränsvallen, a town near Haparanda in Sweden. Together with the Haparanda-based club Haparanda SKT, a joint team called HaparandaTornio Bandy was created to play in the Swedish league system, but ToPV has also kept on playing in the Finnish Bandyliiga.

ToPV has been Finnish bandy champions six times for men's teams, in 2000, 2002, 2004, 2005, 2006, and 2007, and their women's team once, in 2010.
