= Warkauden Pallo -35 =

WP 35
- City: Varkaus, Finland
- League: Bandyliiga
- Founded: 1935; 90 years ago
- Home arena: Kämäri

Warkauden Pallo -35 (WP 35) is a sports club in Varkaus in Finland, founded in 1935. The club is most well known for its successful men's team in bandy, which is playing in the Bandyliiga, the top-tier of Finnish bandy.

== Bandy titles ==
- Finnish champions 16 times: 1943, 1945, 1946, 1947, 1948, 1950, 1952, 1954, 1965, 1966, 1967, 1971, 1993, 1994, 1995, 1996
- 7 times runner-up: 1938, 1944, 1970, 1972, 1974, 1976, 1992
- 14 times bronze: 1939, 1951, 1953, 1955, 1963, 1968, 1969, 1975, 1990, 1997, 1999, 2003, 2004, 2008
- Runner-up in the European Cup in 1993
