= Finland's Bandy Association =

Governing body for the sport of bandy in Finland

The logo of the association.

Finland's Bandy Association (Finnish: Suomen Jääpalloliitto, Swedish: Finlands Bandyförbund) is the governing body for the sport of bandy in Finland. Bandy was one of the sports for which the Ball Association of Finland, founded in 1907, was created. The present Finnish Bandy Association was founded on 18 March 1972, to take over bandy from the Ball Association of Finland, which from then on concentrated on association football only.

== History ==
Bandy came to Finland from St. Petersburg in Russia in the 1890s. The first club was Viborgs Skridskoklubb in Vyborg, which was Finnish back then. At the Nordic Games held in Sweden in 1901 (a predecessor of the Winter Olympic Games), bandy was included in the programme and in 1907, similar winter games were held in Helsinki and bandy was again included. Finland was represented by the club Polyteknikkojen Urheiluseura (PUS) at the 1907 games, but the winner of the competition was a combined team from Sweden, which defeated PUS as well as the team from St. Petersburg. The first Finnish Championships were played in 1908; in the finals, PUS beat Helsingin IFK 8-3. Bandy was the first team sport, for which a Finnish championship was created. Finland became independent in 1918 and Finland's first international as an independent country was against Sweden in 1919, which Finland won 4-1. The first game between two ladies' teams known to have been played in Finland was in March 1916, Åbo Simklubb vs Helsingfors Damhockeyklubb, 3-1.

Finland was one of the founding members of the Federation of International Bandy in 1955 and in 1957 the very first Bandy World Championship was held at the Helsinki Olympic Stadium.

In 2008 the Finnish bandy league, Bandyliiga, celebrated its 100th anniversary.

=== Presidents ===
- Erik Berner, 1972–1978
- Pentti Seppälä, 1978–1983
- Mauno Forsman, 1983–1987
- Carl Gerhard Fogelberg, 1987–1992
- Michael Sandbacka, 1992–1996
- Risto Suves, 1996–1998
- Juha Hilmola, 1998–2008
- Topiantti Äikäs, 2008–

== Domestic play ==
=== Finnish Championship ===
The Finnish bandy championship has been played annually since 1908. The winning team of the Bandyliiga play-off is named champion.

There is also a Finnish Championship for women's teams.

=== Finnish Cup ===
The Bandy Association also arranges the Finnish Cup. The first Finnish Cup was played in 1960.

== National teams ==
- (Finland) Men's team
- (Finland) Women's team
