= Brahenkenttä =

Sports field in Helsinki, Finland

Coordinates: 60.1875°N 24.9492°E

Brahe Field
- Finnish: Brahenkenttä; Swedish: Braheplan
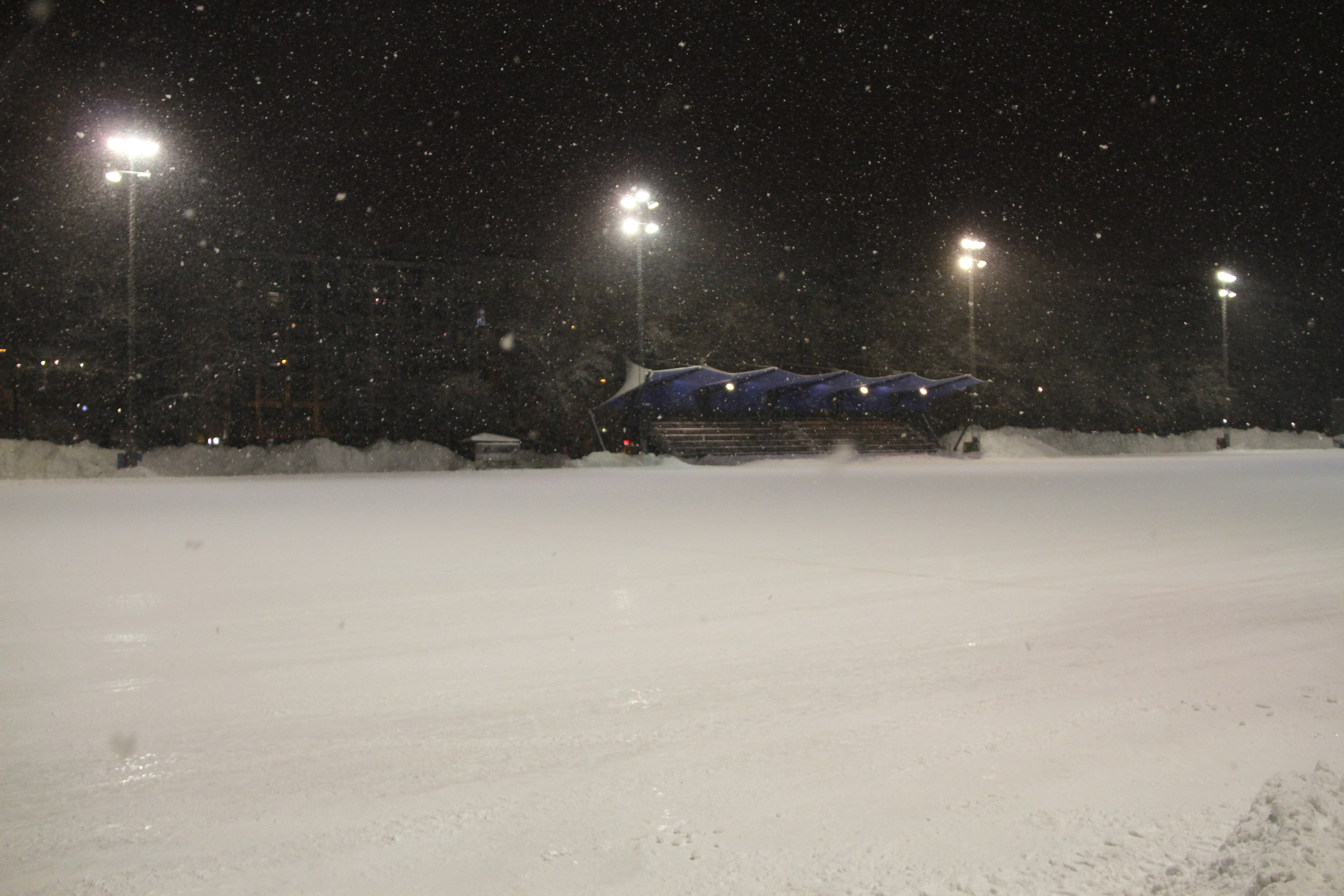
- Interactive map of Brahe Field
- Location: Helsinki, Finland

Tenants
- HIFK Bandy, KäPa

Brahe Field (Finnish: Brahenkenttä; Swedish: Braheplan), is a sports ground in Helsinki, Finland. It is the home field for Käpylän Pallo football club and the HIFK bandy club.

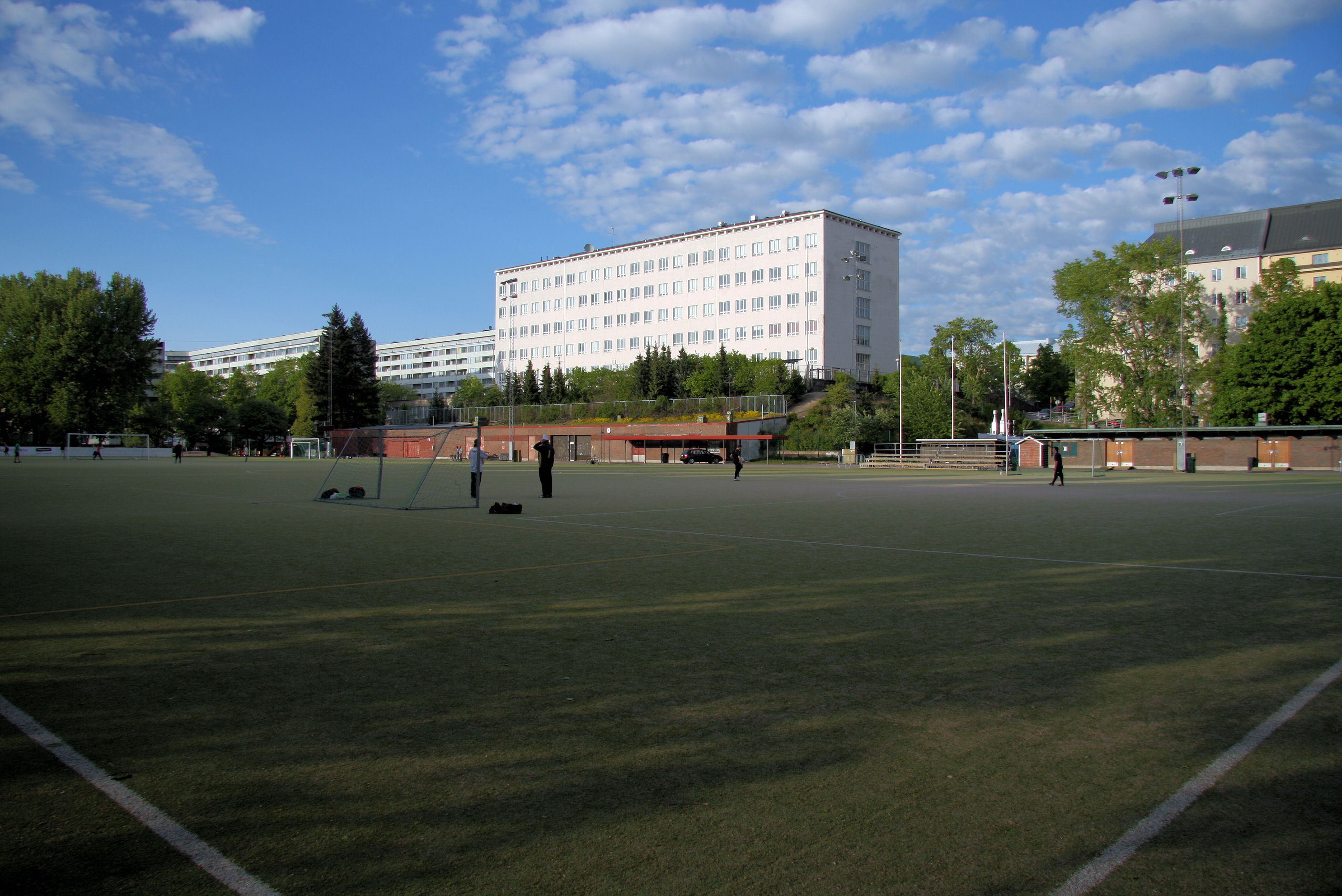
Brahenkenttä in 2008

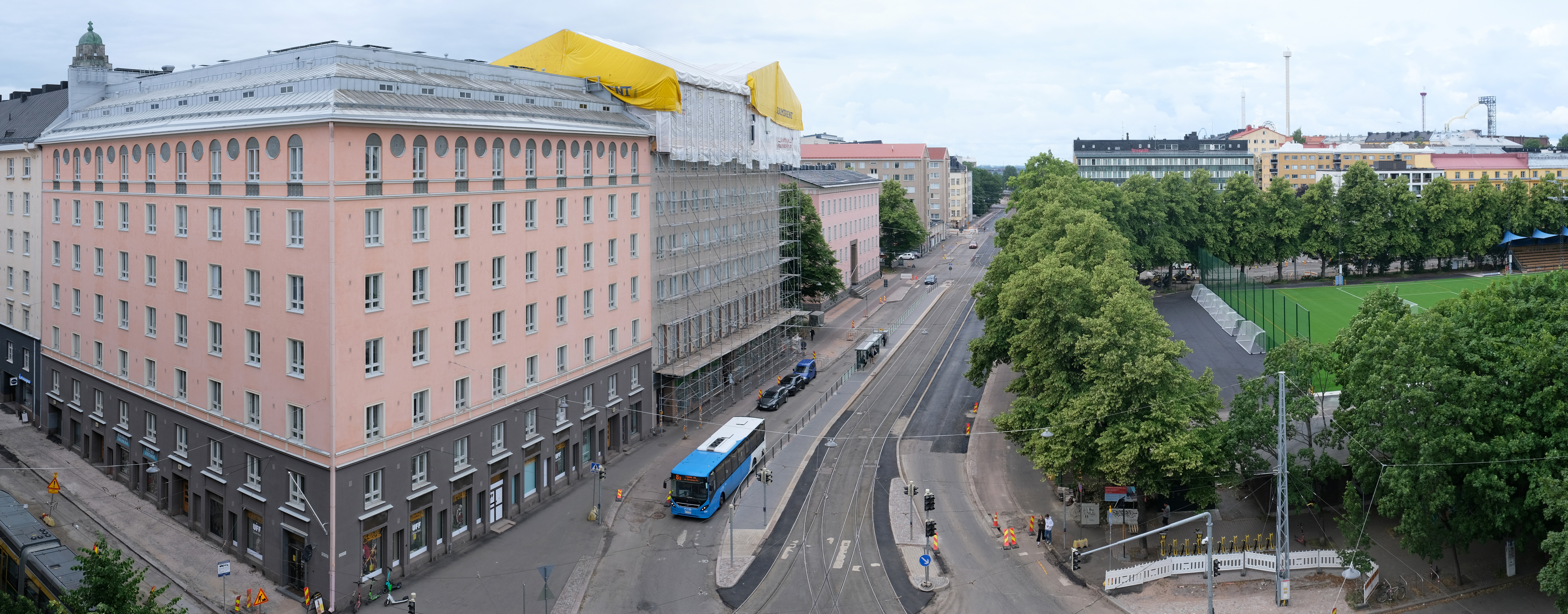
Brahenkenttä is located north of Helsinginkatu
