= Mikkelin Kampparit =

Kampparit
- City: Mikkeli, Finland
- League: Bandyliiga
- Founded: 1972; 53 years ago
- Home arena: Hänninhauta

Mikkelin Kampparit is a bandy club in Mikkeli, Finland. The team colours are black and white. The club was founded in 1972, the same year as when Finland's Bandy Association separated from the Finnish Football Association.

In 2012 and 2015, the club became Finnish bandy champion.
