= Veiterä =

- City: Lappeenranta, Finland
- League: Bandyliiga
- Founded: 1950; 76 years ago
- Home arena: Kisapuiston tekojäärata

Veiterä is a Finnish bandy club based in Lappeenranta. It is the reigning national champion and has become the national champion six times for men's teams (1951, 1955, 1957, 1980, 2017 and 2018) and once for women's teams (2012).
