= Jyväskylän Seudun Palloseura =

- Full name: Jyväskylän Seudun Palloseura
- Nickname: JPS
- Founded: 1962; 64 years ago
- Ground: Vehkalammen kenttä Jyväskylä; Finland
- Chairman: Jaana Hokkanen
- Coach: Matti Kautto; Hannu Karjalainen; Aki Alanen
- League: Kolmonen
Home colours

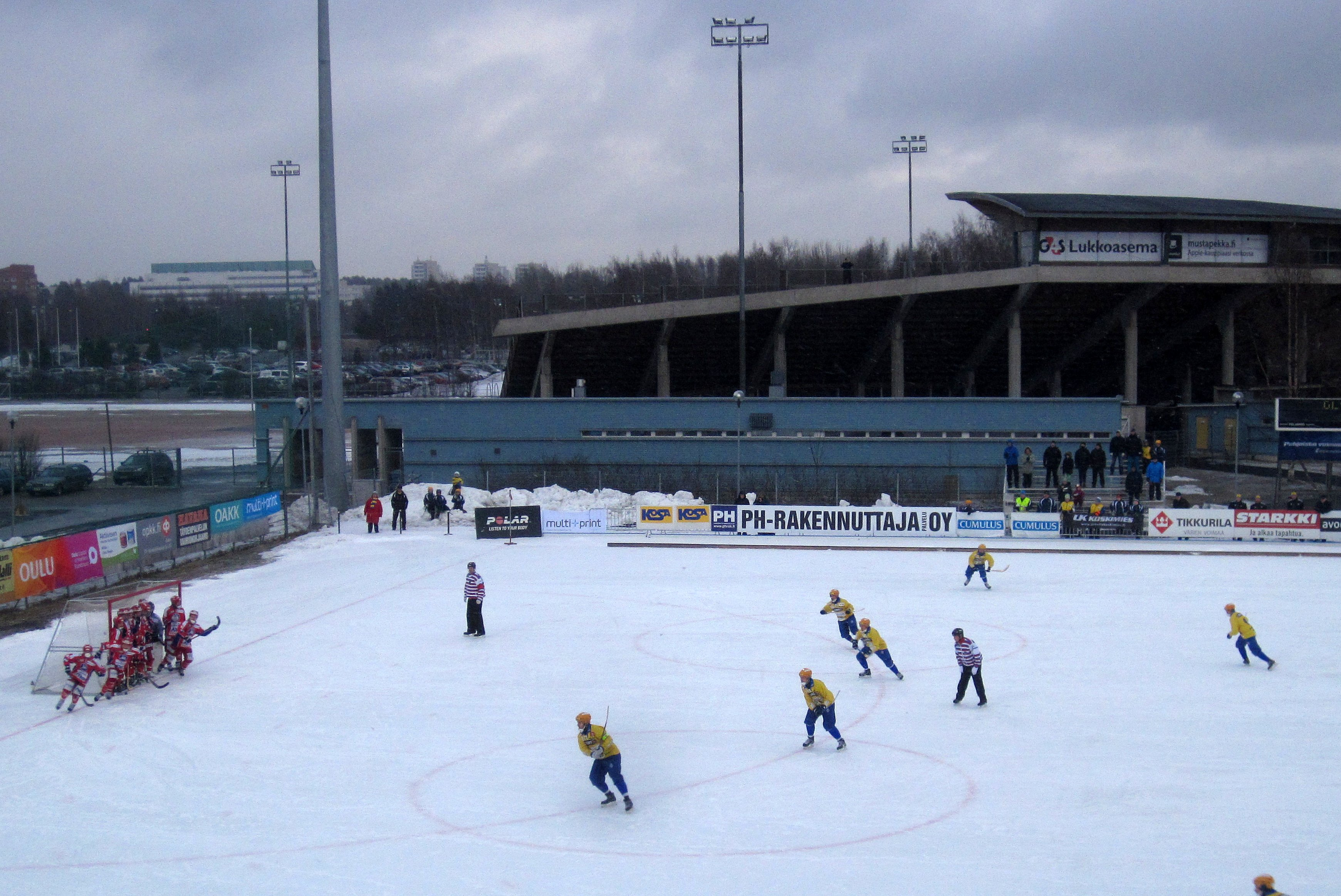
JPS in the 2014 final

Jyväskylän Seudun Palloseura (abbreviated JPS) is a sports club from Jyväskylä, Finland. The club was formed in 1962 and their home ground is Vehkalammen kenttä.

The men's football team currently plays in the Kolmonen (Third Division). The other main sporting activity run by the club is bandy. Their home ice is Viitaniemen tekojäärata and they play in Bandyliiga, the top league for bandy in Finland.

== Bandy ==
JPS won the Finnish Cup in 2017.

The club has been playing in the national top-tier Bandyliiga for years and played the final for the Finnish Championship in 2014 but lost against Oulun Luistinseura. The club was awarded the bronze medal in 2017. In 2019 the national championship was won for the first time. Their home arena is the Viitaniemen kenttä.

== Football ==
=== Season to season ===
Season to season of JPS

| Season | Level | Division | Section | Administration | Position | Movements |
|---|---|---|---|---|---|---|
| 1965 | Tier 4 | Aluesarja (Area Series) | Group 14 Central Finland | Finnish FA(Suomen Palloliitto) | 6th | Relegated |
| 1966 | | | | | | no information |
| 1967 | Tier 4 | Aluesarja (Area Series) | Group 14 Central Finland | Finnish FA(Suomen Palloliitto) | 6th | Relegated |
| 1968 | | | | | | no information |
| 1969 | | | | | | no information |
| 1970 | Tier 4 | 4. Divisioona (Fourth Division) | Group 14 Central Finland | Finnish FA(Suomen Palloliitto) | 4th | |
| 1971 | Tier 4 | 4. Divisioona (Fourth Division) | Group 9 Saimaa & Central Finland | Finnish FA(Suomen Palloliitto) | 7th | |
| 1972 | Tier 4 | 4. Divisioona (Fourth Division) | Group 14 Central Finland | Finnish FA(Suomen Palloliitto) | 2nd | Promotion Playoff |
| 1973 | Tier 5 | 4. Divisioona (Fourth Division) | Group 14 Central Finland | Central Finland (SPL Keski-Suomi) | 2nd | |
| 1974 | Tier 5 | 4. Divisioona (Fourth Division) | Group 14 Central Finland | Central Finland (SPL Keski-Suomi) | 3rd | |
| 1975 | Tier 5 | 4. Divisioona (Fourth Division) | Group 14 Central Finland | Central Finland (SPL Keski-Suomi) | 3rd | |
| 1976 | Tier 5 | 4. Divisioona (Fourth Division) | Group 14 Central Finland | Central Finland (SPL Keski-Suomi) | 8th | |
| 1977 | Tier 5 | 4. Divisioona (Fourth Division) | Group 14 Central Finland | Central Finland (SPL Keski-Suomi) | 6th | |
| 1978 | Tier 5 | 4. Divisioona (Fourth Division) | Group 14 Central Finland | Central Finland (SPL Keski-Suomi) | 7th | |
| 1979 | Tier 5 | 4. Divisioona (Fourth Division) | Group 14 Central Finland | Central Finland (SPL Keski-Suomi) | 8th | |
| 1980 | Tier 5 | 4. Divisioona (Fourth Division) | Group 14 Central Finland | Central Finland (SPL Keski-Suomi) | 3rd | |
| 1981 | Tier 5 | 4. Divisioona (Fourth Division) | Group 14 Central Finland | Central Finland (SPL Keski-Suomi) | 6th | |
| 1982 | Tier 5 | 4. Divisioona (Fourth Division) | Group 14 Central Finland | Central Finland (SPL Keski-Suomi) | 2nd | Promotion Playoff |
| 1983 | Tier 5 | 4. Divisioona (Fourth Division) | Group 14 Central Finland | Central Finland (SPL Keski-Suomi) | 2nd | Promotion Playoff |
| 1984 | Tier 5 | 4. Divisioona (Fourth Division) | Group 14 Central Finland | Central Finland (SPL Keski-Suomi) | 3rd | |
| 1985 | Tier 5 | 4. Divisioona (Fourth Division) | Group 14 Central Finland | Central Finland (SPL Keski-Suomi) | 1st | Promoted |
| 1986 | Tier 4 | 3. Divisioona (Third Division) | Group 5 Tampere & Central Finland | Finnish FA(Suomen Palloliitto) | 7th | |
| 1987 | Tier 4 | 3. Divisioona (Third Division) | Group 5 Tampere & Central Finland | Finnish FA(Suomen Palloliitto) | 8th | |
| 1988 | Tier 4 | 3. Divisioona (Third Division) | Group 5 Häme, Lahti & Central Finland | Finnish FA(Suomen Palloliitto) | 11th | Relegated |
| 1989-1997 | | | | | | no information |
| 1998 | Tier 5 | Nelonen (Fourth Division) | | Central Finland (SPL Keski-Suomi) | 5th | |
| 1999 | Tier 5 | Nelonen (Fourth Division) | | Central Finland (SPL Keski-Suomi) | 10th | |
| 2000 | Tier 5 | Nelonen (Fourth Division) | | Central Finland (SPL Keski-Suomi) | 2nd | Promoted |
| 2001 | Tier 4 | Kolmonen (Third Division) | | Central Finland (SPL Keski-Suomi) | 8th | |
| 2002 | Tier 4 | Kolmonen (Third Division) | | Central Finland (SPL Keski-Suomi) | 7th | |
| 2003 | Tier 4 | Kolmonen (Third Division) | | Central Finland (SPL Keski-Suomi) | 7th | |
| 2004 | Tier 4 | Kolmonen (Third Division) | | Central Finland (SPL Keski-Suomi) | 8th | |
| 2005 | Tier 4 | Kolmonen (Third Division) | | Central Finland (SPL Keski-Suomi) | 9th | Relegation Play-offs |
| 2006 | Tier 4 | Kolmonen (Third Division) | | Central Finland (SPL Keski-Suomi) | 8th | |
| 2007 | Tier 4 | Kolmonen (Third Division) | | Central Finland (SPL Keski-Suomi) | 7th | |
| 2008 | Tier 4 | Kolmonen (Third Division) | | Central Finland (SPL Keski-Suomi) | 6th | |
| 2009 | Tier 4 | Kolmonen (Third Division) | | Eastern and Central Finland (SPL Itä-Suomi) | 10th | |
| 2010 | Tier 4 | Kolmonen (Third Division) | | Eastern and Central Finland (SPL Itä-Suomi) | 4th | |
| 2011 | Tier 4 | Kolmonen (Third Division) | | Eastern and Central Finland (SPL Itä-Suomi) | 1st | Promotion Playoff |
| 2012 | Tier 4 | Kolmonen (Third Division) | | Eastern and Central Finland (SPL Itä-Suomi) | 3rd | |
| 2013 | Tier 4 | Kolmonen (Third Division) | | Eastern and Central Finland (SPL Itä-Suomi) | 6th | |
| 2014 | Tier 4 | Kolmonen (Third Division) | | Eastern and Central Finland (SPL Itä-Suomi) | 4th | |
| 2015 | Tier 4 | Kolmonen (Third Division) | | Eastern and Central Finland (SPL Itä-Suomi) | 6th | |
| 2016 | Tier 4 | Kolmonen (Third Division) | | Eastern and Central Finland (SPL Itä-Suomi) | 6th | |
| 2017 | Tier 4 | Kolmonen (Third Division) | | Eastern and Central Finland (SPL Itä-Suomi) | 6th | |
| 2018 | Tier 4 | Kolmonen (Third Division) | | Eastern and Central Finland (SPL Itä-Suomi) | 8th | |
| 2019 | Tier 4 | Kolmonen (Third Division) | | Eastern and Central Finland (SPL Itä-Suomi) | 5th | |
| 2020 | Tier 4 | Kolmonen (Third Division) | Group AC | Eastern and Central Finland (SPL Itä-Suomi) | 11th | |
| 2021 | Tier 4 | Kolmonen (Third Division) | Group AC | Eastern and Central Finland (SPL Itä-Suomi) | 9th | |
| 2022 | Tier 4 | Kolmonen (Third Division) | Group AC | Eastern and Central Finland (SPL Itä-Suomi) | 8th | |
| 2023 | Tier 4 | Kolmonen (Third Division) | Group AC | Eastern and Central Finland (SPL Itä-Suomi) | 1st | Promoted |
| 2024 | Tier 4 | Kakkonen (Second Division) | Group C | Finnish FA(Suomen Palloliitto) | 8th | |
| 2025 | Tier 4 | Kakkonen (Second Division) | Group A | Finnish FA(Suomen Palloliitto) | | |

- 33 seasons in Fourth tier
- 16 seasons in Fifth tier

=== Club Structure ===
Jyväskylän Seudun Palloseura run 1 men's team and 3 boys teams.

=== 2010 season ===
JPS are competing in the Kolmonen administered by the Itä-Suomi SPL and Keski-Suomi SPL. This is the fourth highest tier in the Finnish football system. In 2009 JPS finished in tenth place in the Kolmonen.

JPS II are not running a side in the Vitonen in 2010.

=== Current squad ===
- (Finland) 1. Veli-Matti Tranberg
- (Finland) 2. Joonas Heino
- (Finland) 3. Kasper Mäkelä
- (Finland) 4. Anton Stützle
- (Finland) 5. Timo Eirola
- (Finland) 7. Sami Karjalainen
- (Finland) 8. Niko Nuttunen
- (Finland) 9. Eemeli Jokinen
- (Finland) 10. Jukka Hanhela
- (Finland) 11. Kimmo Väre
- (Finland) 12. Mikko Huhtiniemi
- (Finland) 13. Ville Kujanpää
- (Finland) 14. Esko Häyrynen
- (Finland) 15. Jaakko Ahokas
- (Finland) 16. Joel Nissinen
- (Finland) 17. Matti Kaappola
- (Finland) 18. Vesa – Matti Alhonen
- (Finland) 19. Juha Linjala
- (Finland) 20. Marcus Åberg
- (Finland) 21. Alejandro Ylönen
- (Finland) 22. Ville Ketola
- (Finland) 23. Gustavo Tedesco
- (Finland) 24. Viljo Väisänen
- (Finland) 31. Anssi Korkiakoski
- (Finland) 33. Riku Lamberg

== References and sources ==
- Official Club Website
- Finnish Wikipedia
- Suomen Cup
