= Veitsiluodon Vastus =

- City: Kemi, Finland
- Founded: 1930; 96 years ago

Veitsiluodon Vastus is a Finnish bandy club, situated in Kemi, which has become national champions four times for men (1969, 1972, 1973, 1974) and three times for women (1979, 1980, 2013). The club was founded in 1930 and the club colours are red and white.
