= Oulun Luistinseura =

Finnish sports club

OLS
- Full name: Oulun Luistinseura
- Founded: 1880
- Ground: Castrén
- Capacity: 2500
- Chairman: Timo Salmi
- Manager: Mikko Mannila
- League: Ykkönen
- 2026: Ykkönen, 4th of 12
- Website: https://ols.fi/
Home colours	Away colours

Oulun Luistinseura (or OLS) is a Finnish multi-sports club, based in Oulu. The club has football, bandy, bowling and floorball sections. Since 2020, the club's football first team AC Oulu/OLS has been the reserve team of Veikkausliiga club AC Oulu and competes in Finnish third tier.

== Football ==
OLS football team was founded in 1941 by clubs bandy players. Throughout the years the club has played mostly in lower divisions, never competing in the highest tier of Finnish football except as a part of short lived merger with OTP called FC Oulu in the early 1990s. The most successful part of OLS is the youth academy which has produced many national team level players. Men's football team earned promotion to Kakkonen (the third tier of Finnish football) for 2014 season.

== Current squad ==
As of 1 September 2026

Note: Flags indicate national team as defined under FIFA eligibility rules; some limited exceptions apply. Players may hold more than one non-FIFA nationality.

No.	Pos.	Nation	Player
4	DF	FIN	Lukas Ilola
12	GK	FIN	Johannes Pentti
15	DF	FIN	Otso-Pekka Parkkila
19	MF	NGR	Joel Omotayo
23	DF	FIN	Sampo Ala-Iso
31	DF	FIN	Matias Babb
36	MF	FIN	Joel Lotvonen
37	MF	FIN	Lucas Piirto
38	MF	FIN	Juuso Polvi
40	MF	FIN	Jesse Korhonen
44	DF	FIN	Otto-Eemeli Niemelä
45	FW	FIN	Eemil Merikanto
46	DF	FIN	Macar Ajoung
47	FW	FIN	Eemeli Raittinen

No.	Pos.	Nation	Player
49	DF	FIN	Touko Ridanpää
51	FW	FIN	Olle Lämsä
54	DF	FIN	Arttu Aapajärvi
56	FW	FIN	Terry Ablade
57	GK	FIN	Miro Fyrsten
60	FW	FIN	Pyry Ylläsjärvi
62	GK	FIN	Tobias Backman
76	DF	FIN	Ilari Arvola
79	DF	FIN	Leevi Laru
80	MF	FIN	Hugo Taumberger
83	MF	FIN	Lenni Teppo
86	MF	FIN	Aaron Korkala
90	FW	FIN	Eemeli Eronen

== League history in Football ==
Season to season of OLS
- 4 season in 2nd Tier
- 37 seasons in 3rd Tier
- 22 seasons in 4th Tier

Season	Level	Division	Section	Administration	Position	Movements
1956	Tier 4	Aluesarja (Area Series)	Group 11 - Oulu	Finnish FA (Suomen Palloliitto)	4th	
1957	Tier 4	Aluesarja (Area Series)	Group 17 - Oulu	Finnish FA (Suomen Palloliitto)	3rd	
1958	Tier 4	Aluesarja (Area Series)	Group 16 - Oulu	Finnish FA (Suomen Palloliitto)	1st	Promoted
1959	Tier 3	Maakuntasarja (Regional League)	Group 9	Finnish FA (Suomen Palloliitto)	5th	
1960	Tier 3	Maakuntasarja (Regional League)	Group 9	Finnish FA (Suomen Palloliitto)	6th	
1961	Tier 3	Maakuntasarja (Regional League)	Group 9	Finnish FA (Suomen Palloliitto)	8th	Relegated
1962	Tier 4	Aluesarja (Area Series)	Group 17 - Oulu	Finnish FA (Suomen Palloliitto)	1st	Promoted
1963	Tier 3	Maakuntasarja (Regional League)	Group 9	Finnish FA (Suomen Palloliitto)	8th	Relegated
1964	Tier 4	Aluesarja (Area Series)	Group 17 - Oulu	Finnish FA (Suomen Palloliitto)	2nd	
1965	Tier 4	Aluesarja (Area Series)	Group 17 - Oulu	Finnish FA (Suomen Palloliitto)	2nd	
1966	Tier 4	Aluesarja (Area Series)	Group 17 - Oulu	Finnish FA (Suomen Palloliitto)	4th	
1967	Tier 4	Aluesarja (Area Series)	Group 17 - Oulu	Finnish FA (Suomen Palloliitto)	3rd	
1968	Tier 4	Aluesarja (Area Series)	Group 16 - Oulu	Finnish FA (Suomen Palloliitto)	4th	
1969	Tier 4	Aluesarja (Area Series)	Group 16 - Oulu	Finnish FA (Suomen Palloliitto)	2nd	
1970	Tier 4	4. divisioona (Fourth Division)	Group 17 - Oulu	Finnish FA (Suomen Palloliitto)	2nd	Merger with Oulun Pallo-Veikot
1971	Tier 3	3. divisioona (Third Division)	Group 7	Finnish FA (Suomen Palloliitto)	4th	as OLS-Veikot
1972	Tier 3	3. divisioona (Third Division)	Group 9	Finnish FA (Suomen Palloliitto)	1st	OLS-Veikot - Promoted
1973	Tier 3	2. divisioona (Second Division)	North Group	Finnish FA (Suomen Palloliitto)	8th	OLS-Veikot
1974	Tier 3	2. divisioona (Second Division)	North Group	Finnish FA (Suomen Palloliitto)	9th	OLS-Veikot
1975	Tier 3	2. divisioona (Second Division)	North Group	Finnish FA (Suomen Palloliitto)	8th	
1976	Tier 3	2. divisioona (Second Division)	North Group	Finnish FA (Suomen Palloliitto)	3rd	
1977	Tier 3	2. divisioona (Second Division)	North Group	Finnish FA (Suomen Palloliitto)	1st	Promoted
1978	Tier 2	1. divisioona (First Division)		Finnish FA (Suomen Palloliitto)	12th	Relegated
1979	Tier 3	2. divisioona (Second Division)	North Group	Finnish FA (Suomen Palloliitto)	6th	
1980	Tier 3	2. divisioona (Second Division)	North Group	Finnish FA (Suomen Palloliitto)	10th	Relegated
1981	Tier 4	3. divisioona (Third Division)	Group 9	Finnish FA (Suomen Palloliitto)	6th	
1982	Tier 4	3. divisioona (Third Division)	Group 9	Finnish FA (Suomen Palloliitto)	6th	
1983	Tier 4	3. divisioona (Third Division)	Group 9	Finnish FA (Suomen Palloliitto)	2nd	Promotion Playoff
1984	Tier 4	3. divisioona (Third Division)	Group 9	Finnish FA (Suomen Palloliitto)	7th	
1985	Tier 4	3. divisioona (Third Division)	Group 9	Finnish FA (Suomen Palloliitto)	3rd	
1986	Tier 4	3. divisioona (Third Division)	Group 9	Finnish FA (Suomen Palloliitto)	2nd	
1987	Tier 4	3. divisioona (Third Division)	Group 9	Finnish FA (Suomen Palloliitto)	1st	Promoted
1988	Tier 3	2. divisioona (Second Division)	North Group	Finnish FA (Suomen Palloliitto)	2nd	
1989	Tier 3	2. divisioona (Second Division)	North Group	Finnish FA (Suomen Palloliitto)	4th	
1990	Tier 3	2. divisioona (Second Division)	North Group	Finnish FA (Suomen Palloliitto)	1st	FC OLS - Promoted
1991	Tier 2	1. divisioona (First Division)		Finnish FA (Suomen Palloliitto)	9th	Merged with Oulun Työväen Palloilijat to FC Oulu
1992-1995						No first team football
1996	Tier 3	Kakkonen (Second Division)	North Group	Finnish FA (Suomen Palloliitto)	10th	As OPP due to FA naming regulations - Relegated
1997	Tier 3	Kakkonen (Second Division)	North Group	Finnish FA (Suomen Palloliitto)	8th	Took place of OPS
1998	Tier 3	Kakkonen (Second Division)	North Group	Finnish FA (Suomen Palloliitto)	6th	As OPS due to FA naming regulation
1999	Tier 3	Kakkonen (Second Division)	North Group	Finnish FA (Suomen Palloliitto)	2nd	Promotion Playoff
2000	Tier 3	Kakkonen (Second Division)	North Group	Finnish FA (Suomen Palloliitto)	5th	
2001	Tier 3	Kakkonen (Second Division)	North Group	Finnish FA (Suomen Palloliitto)	9th	
2002	Tier 3	Kakkonen (Second Division)	North Group	Finnish FA (Suomen Palloliitto)	1st	Promotion Playoff - Promoted
2003	Tier 2	Ykkönen (First Division)		Finnish FA (Suomen Palloliitto)	13th	Relegated
2004	Tier 3	Kakkonen (Second Division)	Northern Group	Finnish FA (Suomen Palloliitto)	2nd	Promotion Playoff - Lost but Promoted due to bankruptcy of FC Jazz
2005	Tier 2	Ykkönen (First Division)		Finnish FA (Suomen Palloliitto)	13th	Relegated
2006	Tier 3	Kakkonen (Second Division)	Group C	Finnish FA (Suomen Palloliitto)	4th	
2007	Tier 3	Kakkonen (Second Division)	Group C	Finnish FA (Suomen Palloliitto)	7th	
2008	Tier 3	Kakkonen (Second Division)	Group C	Finnish FA (Suomen Palloliitto)	9th	
2009	Tier 3	Kakkonen (Second Division)	Group C	Finnish FA (Suomen Palloliitto)	12th	Relegated
2010-2012						No first team football
2013	Tier 4	Kolmonen (Third Division)	Northern Finland	Finnish FA (Suomen Palloliitto)	1st	Promoted
2014	Tier 3	Kakkonen (Second Division)	Northern Group	Finnish FA (Suomen Palloliitto)	10th	Relegated
2015	Tier 4	Kolmonen (Third Division)	Northern Finland	Finnish FA (Suomen Palloliitto)	4th	
2016	Tier 4	Kolmonen (Third Division)	Northern Finland	Finnish FA (Suomen Palloliitto)	3rd	
2017	Tier 4	Kolmonen (Third Division)	Northern Finland	Finnish FA (Suomen Palloliitto)	1st	Promoted
2018	Tier 3	Kakkonen (Second Division)	Group c	Finnish FA (Suomen Palloliitto)	8th	
2019	Tier 3	Kakkonen (Second Division)	Group c	Finnish FA (Suomen Palloliitto)	7th	
2020	Tier 3	Kakkonen (Second Division)	Group c	Finnish FA (Suomen Palloliitto)	11th	Remained due to bankruptcy of AC Kajaani
2021	Tier 3	Kakkonen (Second Division)	Group A	Finnish FA (Suomen Palloliitto)	8th	
2022	Tier 3	Kakkonen (Second Division)	Group C	Finnish FA (Suomen Palloliitto)	4th	
2023	Tier 3	Kakkonen (Second Division)	Group C	Finnish FA (Suomen Palloliitto)	1st	Promotion playoff to Ykkösliiga - Promoted to Ykkönen
2024	Tier 3	Ykkönen (First Division)		Finnish FA (Suomen Palloliitto)	3rd	
2025	Tier 3	Ykkönen (First Division)		Finnish FA (Suomen Palloliitto)		

== Bandy ==
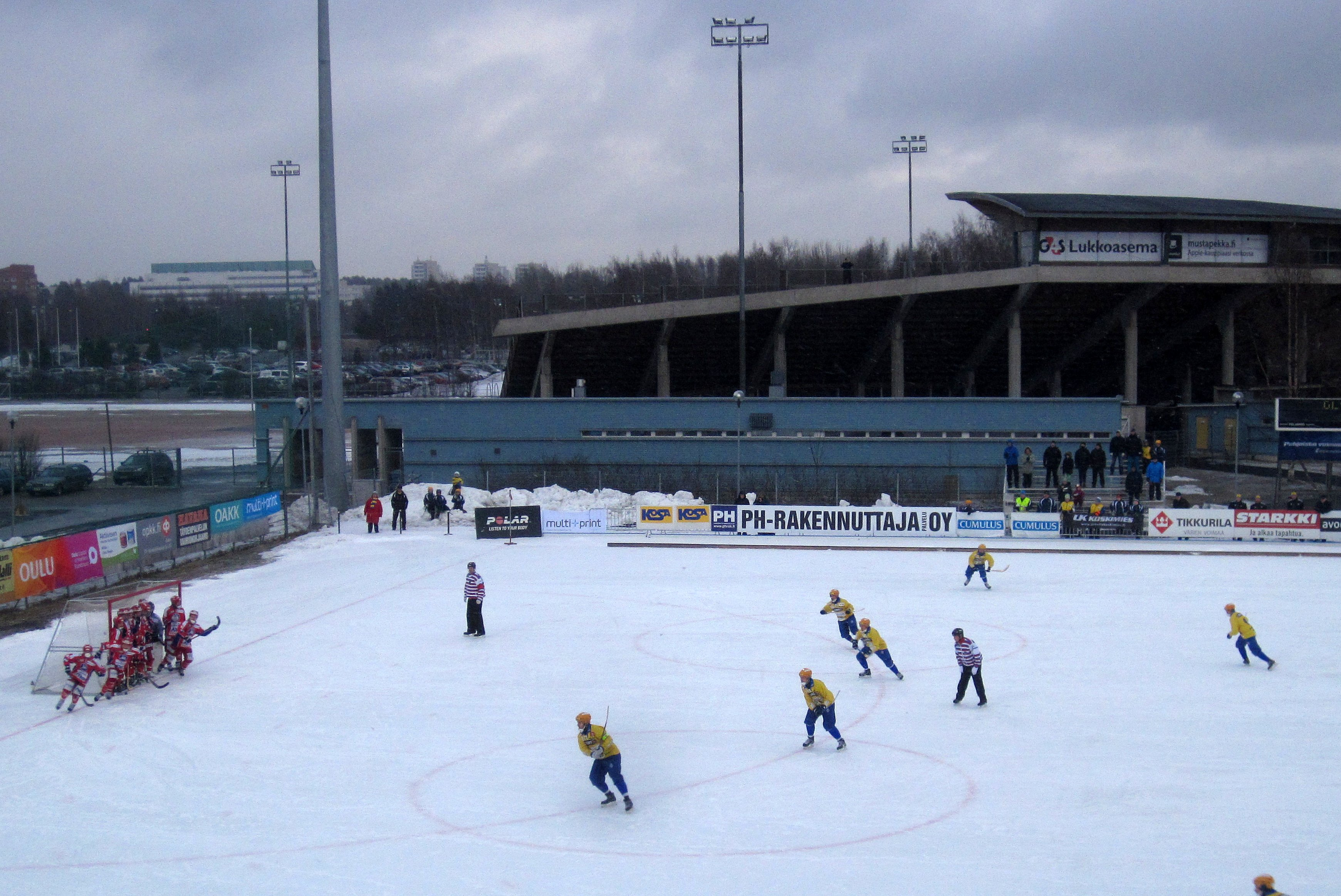
Oulun Luistinseura beats Jyväskylän Seudun Palloseura in the 2014 Finland men's national bandy championship final. Here playing at home at Pakkalan kenttä.

OLS is one of the most successful clubs in Finland and is the only non-Swedish or Russian-Soviet club to have won the Bandy World Cup, having won the title in 1976. In 1977 and 1990 they were European Cup runners-up.

OLS have won the Bandyliiga play-off to become Finnish champions 16 times the first was in 1970 and the most recent title was in 2014. OLS has won the Finnish championship in the following years: 1970, 1975, 1976, 1977, 1979, 1982, 1983, 1984, 1986, 1990, 1991, 2001, 2003, 2008, 2009, and 2014.
