= Botnia-69 =

Finnish bandy club

- City: Helsinki, Finland
- League: Bandyliiga
- Founded: 1969; 56 years ago
- Home arena: Oulunkylä Ice Rink

Botnia-69 is a Finnish bandy club in Helsinki. The club has won the Finnish championship four times, 1989, 1992, 1997 and 2016. In 1992 they were runners-up of the European Cup. Their home arena is the Oulunkylä Ice Rink.

In 2012, the club's P13 youth team won the Borlänge Bandy Cup in Sweden.
