= 1996 3 Nations Cup rosters =

The 1996 3 Nations Cup rosters consisted of 73 players from three women's national ice hockey teams.

== Canada ==
On October 18, 1996, Hockey Canada named its final 27-woman roster for the tournament. Laura Leslie and Marianne Grnak, two members of the gold medal winning Canadian team at the 1994 IIHF Women's World Championship, were among the final cuts. Forwards Danielle Goyette and Stacy Wilson remained on the roster despite being injured with separated shoulders throughout the tournament. Canada was led by two coaches at the tournament—head coach Shannon Miller and assistant coach Danièle Sauvageau. A third coach, Melody Davidson, was with the team during the evaluation camp but was not named to the final tournament coaching staff.

- Head coach: Shannon Miller (CAN)

=== Skaters ===
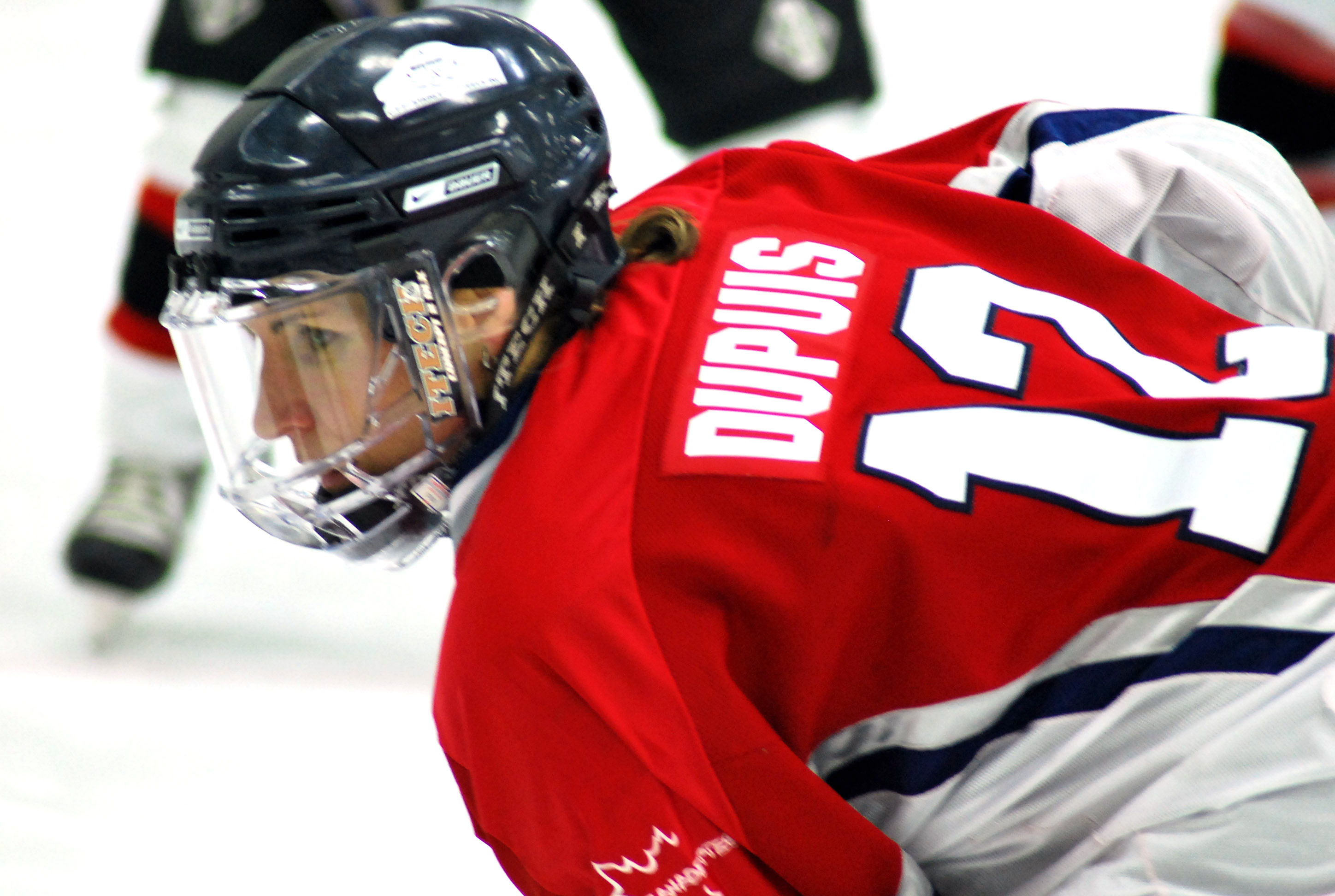
Lori Dupuis scored one goal in five tournament games played.

Number	Position	Player	GP	G	A	Pts	PIM
39	F	Amanda Benoit	5	1	2	3	8
6	D	Thérèse Brisson	4	0	0	0	8
77	D	Cassie Campbell	5	0	2	2	0
7	D	Isabelle Chartrand	4	1	1	2	0
13	F	Nancy Deschamps	5	2	2	4	6
21	D	Judy Diduck	2	0	0	0	2
18	F	Nancy Drolet	4	2	1	3	0
12	F	Lori Dupuis	5	1	1	2	2
5	D	Rebecca Fahey	4	0	1	1	2
15	F	Danielle Goyette	0	0	0	0	0
24	F	Melanie Haz	4	0	0	0	0
91	D	Geraldine Heaney	4	0	0	0	4
8	F	Angela James	5	1	2	3	2
20	F	Luce Letendre	4	0	1	1	0
32	F	Tracy Luhowy	4	0	0	0	0
96	F	Karen Nystrom	5	1	1	2	2
11	D	Cheryl Pounder	4	0	0	0	0
3	F	France Saint-Louis	5	1	1	2	0
10	D	Carol Scheibel	4	0	0	0	2
27	F	Laura Schuler	5	0	0	0	14
9	D	Fiona Smith	4	1	0	1	0
61	F	Vicky Sunohara	5	0	1	1	4
22	F	Hayley Wickenheiser	5	1	0	1	12
17	F	Stacy Wilson	0	0	0	0	0

=== Goaltenders ===
Number	Player	GP	W	L	Min	GA	GAA	SV%	SO
35	Danielle Dube	3	2	0	130:00	3	1.38	—	1
30	Lesley Reddon	2	1	1	83:00	2	1.44	—	0
1	Manon Rhéaume	2	1	0	89:00	2	1.36	—	0

== Finland ==
Finland entered the tournament with a 24-woman roster. Finland was led by two coaches at the tournament—head coach Rauno Korpi and assistant coach Jorma Kurjenmäki.

- Head coach: Rauno Korpi (FIN)

=== Skaters ===
Number	Position	Player
10	F	Sari Fisk
7	D	Anne Haanpää
20	D	Kirsi Hänninen
5	D	Satu Huotari
9	F	Marianne Ihalainen
24	F	Kati Kovalainen
15	F	Sari Krooks
22	F	Sanna Lankosaari
17	F	Marika Lehtimäki
8	F	Vilja Lipsonen
2	D	Katri-Helena Luomajoki
12	F	Rose Matilainen
6	D	Pirjo Nieminen
13	F	Riikka Nieminen
25	D	Marja-Helena Pälvilä
29	F	Karoliina Rantamäki
28	F	Katja Riipi
11	F	Heli Romu
27	D	Päivi Salo
14	F	Maria Selin
21	F	Petra Vaarakallio

=== Goaltenders ===
Number	Player
19	Tuula Puputti
1	Liisa-Maria Sneck

== United States ==
The United States entered the tournament with a 22-woman roster. The United States was led by three coaches at the tournament—head coach Ben Smith and assistant coaches Tom Mutch and Digit Murphy. Forward Cammi Granato led the United States with five goals and six points at the tournament,

- Head coach: Ben Smith (USA)

=== Skaters ===
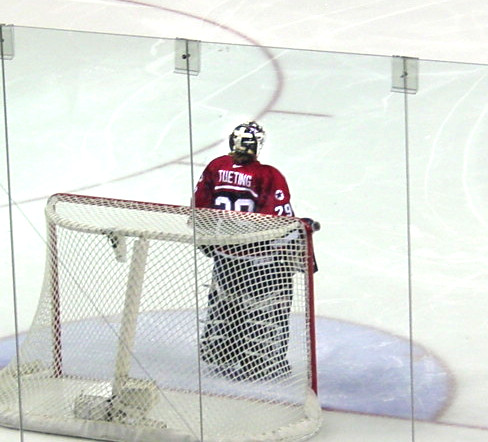
Sarah Tueting played in one game in the tournament as back-up goaltender to Erin Whitten.

Number	Position	Player	GP	G	A	Pts	PIM
26	F	Michele Amidon	5	0	0	0	0
24	D	Chris Bailey	5	0	2	2	6
18	F	Alana Blahoski	4	0	0	0	0
3	F	Lisa Brown-Miller	5	0	1	1	4
6	F	Karyn Bye	5	1	1	2	2
16	D	Wendy Cofran	4	0	0	0	0
5	D	Colleen Coyne	5	0	0	0	2
25	F	Tricia Dunn	5	0	1	1	2
21	F	Cammi Granato	5	5	1	6	2
2	D	Michelle Johansson	4	0	0	0	0
10	F	Andrea Kilbourne	4	1	0	1	0
15	F	Shelley Looney	5	2	1	3	2
7	D	Sue Merz	2	0	0	0	2
11	F	Allison Mleczko	5	1	0	1	4
14	D	Vicki Movsessian	5	0	0	0	4
23	D	Kelly O'Leary	5	0	1	1	0
19	F	Steph O'Sullivan	5	1	4	5	4
17	F	Jeanine Sobek	5	0	1	1	0
22	F	Gretchen Ulion	5	1	0	1	6
9	F	Sandra Whyte	5	0	3	3	0

=== Goaltenders ===
Number	Player	GP	W	L	Min	GA	GAA	SA	SV%	SO
1	Sarah Tueting	1	1	0	60:00	3	3.00	28	.893	0
30	Erin Whitten	4	2	2	240:00	7	1.75	78	.910	0
