= A. J. Mleczko =

American ice hockey player and analyst

- Born: June 14, 1975 (age 51) Nantucket, Massachusetts, U.S.
- Height: 5 ft 11 in (180 cm)
- Weight: 160 lb (73 kg; 11 st 6 lb)
- Position: Forward
- Played for: Harvard
- National team: United States
- Playing career: 1993–2002
Medal record
Representing United States
Women's ice hockey
Olympic Games
Gold medal – first place	1998 Nagano	Tournament
Silver medal – second place	2002 Salt Lake City	Tournament
IIHF World Women's Championships
Silver medal – second place	1997 Canada	Tournament
Silver medal – second place	2000 Canada	Tournament
Silver medal – second place	2001 United States	Tournament

Allison Jaime "A. J." Mleczko Griswold (born June 14, 1975) is an American ice hockey player and analyst. She won a gold medal at the 1998 Winter Olympics and a silver medal at the 2002 Winter Olympics.

== Playing career ==
Mleczko attended New Canaan Country School and is a graduate of The Taft School in Watertown, Connecticut. Mleczko played college hockey at Harvard University, where she led the Crimson to a national title in 1999. That same year she became the second winner of the Patty Kazmaier Award, which is awarded annually to the best female college ice hockey player in the United States. On September 24, 2002, she was inducted into the New England Women's Hall of Fame.

Mleczko was inducted on June 20, 2019, into the National Polish-American Sports Hall of Fame located in Troy, Michigan. Her paternal great-grandparents were Polish immigrants.

== Broadcasting career ==
She is the #3 color commentator for ESPN/ABC, teaming with play-by-play announcer Mike Monaco. and both lead game and studio analyst MSG Networks NHL broadcasts for the New York Islanders. She previously worked for the NHL on NBC, where she became the first woman to commentate for an NHL game, including playoffs. Additionally, she hosts the On the Bus With Cammi & AJ podcast with former teammate Cammi Granato. Furthermore, she also called women's hockey games at the Winter Olympic games for NBC Sports.

== Personal life ==
Mleczko currently resides in Concord, Massachusetts with her husband, Jason, and their four children. She is a cousin of diplomat Rufus Gifford.

== Career statistics ==
Career statistics are from Eliteprospects.com, or The Internet Hockey Database, or USA Hockey, or the Harvard Crimson, or the 2000 United States Women's National Team Media Guide

=== Regular season and playoffs ===
			Regular season					Playoffs
Season	Team	League	GP	G	A	Pts	PIM	GP	G	A	Pts	PIM
1989–90	Connecticut Polar Bears 19U	19U AAA (W)	—	—	—	—	—	—	—	—	—	—
1995–96	Harvard University	—	—	—	—	—	—	—	—	—	—	—
1996–97	Harvard University	—	—	—	—	—	—	—	—	—	—	—
1997–98	Harvard University	AWCHA	—	—	—	—	—	—	—	—	—	—
1998–99	Harvard University	AWCHA	34	37	77	114	—	—	—	—	—	—
NCAA totals			—	128	129	257	—	—	—	—	—	—

=== International ===
Year	Team	Event	Result	GP	G	A	Pts	PIM
1995	USA	Pacific Rim Championship	2nd place, silver medalist(s)	5	1	1	2	—
1996	USA	Pacific Rim Championship	2nd place, silver medalist(s)	5	2	4	6	—
1996	USA	3 Nations Cup	2nd place, silver medalist(s)	5	1	0	1	—
1997	USA	WC	2nd place, silver medalist(s)	5	0	2	2	—
1997	USA	3 Nations Cup	1st place, gold medalist(s)	5	2	0	2	—
1998	USA	OG	1st place, gold medalist(s)	6	2	2	4	4
2000	USA	WC	2nd place, silver medalist(s)	5	1	7	8	2
2001	USA	WC	2nd place, silver medalist(s)	5	1	2	3	2
2002	USA	OG	2nd place, silver medalist(s)	5	1	3	4	6
Senior totals				46	11	21	32	—

== Awards and honors ==
- 1999 American Women's College Hockey Alliance All-Americans, First Team
- Patty Kazmaier Award
- 1999 Bob Allen Women's Player of the Year Award
- Women's Beanpot Hall of Fame (inducted 2011)

Awards and achievements
Preceded by Brandy Fisher	Patty Kazmaier Award; 1998–99	Succeeded by Alison Brewer
