= Cammi Granato =

American ice hockey player (born 1971)

- Hockey Hall of Fame, 2010
- Born: March 25, 1971 (age 55) Downers Grove, Illinois, U.S.
- Height: 5 ft 7 in (170 cm)
- Weight: 141 lb (64 kg; 10 st 1 lb)
- Position: Right wing / Center
- Shot: Right
- Played for: Providence College; Concordia University; Vancouver Griffins; British Columbia Breakers
- National team: United States
- Playing career: 1990–2005
Medal record
Representing United States
Women's ice hockey
Olympic Games
Gold medal – first place	1998 Nagano
Silver medal – second place	2002 Salt Lake City
IIHF World Women's Championships
Gold medal – first place	2005 Sweden
Silver medal – second place	1990 Canada
Silver medal – second place	1992 Finland
Silver medal – second place	1994 United States
Silver medal – second place	1997 Canada
Silver medal – second place	1999 Finland
Silver medal – second place	2000 Canada
Silver medal – second place	2001 United States
Silver medal – second place	2004 Canada
4 Nations Cup
Gold medal – first place	1997 Canada & United States
Gold medal – first place	2003 Sweden
Silver medal – second place	1998 Finland
Silver medal – second place	1999 Canada
Silver medal – second place	2000 United States
Silver medal – second place	2002 Canada
Silver medal – second place	2004 United States
IIHF Women's Pacific Rim Championship
Silver medal – second place	1995 United States
Silver medal – second place	1996 Canada

Catherine Michelle Granato (born March 25, 1971) is an American former ice hockey player and one of the first women to be inducted into the Hockey Hall of Fame in November 2010. She currently works as a Senior Amateur (Scouting) Advisor for the Vancouver Canucks organization after previously serving as an Assistant General Manager from 2022-2026. Granato was the captain of the U.S. women's hockey team that won a gold medal in the 1998 Winter Olympics. She is the younger sister of former NHL player Tony Granato and former Buffalo Sabres head coach Don Granato, and a graduate of Providence College. Granato played hockey for Concordia University in Montreal, Quebec.

Granato has been a recipient of the Lester Patrick Award (2007), and she has been inducted into the IIHF Hall of Fame (2008), the US Hockey Hall of Fame (2008), the Hockey Hall of Fame (2010) and the Rhode Island Hockey Hall of Fame in 2018.

== USA Hockey ==
Granato played in every world championship for the United States from the inaugural event in 1990 to 2005. She was named USA Women's Player of the Year in 1996. Granato was the captain of the U.S. women's hockey team that won a gold medal in the 1998 Winter Olympics. On February 8, 1998, she scored the first ever Olympic goal for the U.S women's hockey team. In 205 career games for the national team, Granato had 186 goals, 157 assists, and 343 points. She is the team's all-time leading scorer.

Granato was cut from the US National team unexpectedly before the 2006 Olympics in Turin, Italy bringing controversy to the decision after being a part of the program since its inaugural season and all-time leading point scorer. The US team subsequently lost its Olympic semifinal match to Sweden, its first-ever international loss to a team other than Canada, and brought home the bronze medal.

== Other teams ==
Granato played hockey for Concordia University in Montreal, Quebec, Canada. In June 1997, New York Islanders general manager Mike Milbury extended an invitation to Granato to attend Islanders training camp. Granato eventually declined.

Granato played for the Vancouver Griffins (2001–02 and 2002–03), a professional women's ice hockey team in the National Women's Hockey League (NWHL).

== Later career ==
Granato is also a rinkside reporter for NBC's NHL coverage, and served as a color commentator for NBC's coverage of women's ice hockey at the 2010 Winter Olympic Games in Vancouver, B.C., Canada. In 1998, Granato served as the color commentator for Los Angeles Kings radio broadcasts.

She currently hosts the On the Bus With Cammi & AJ podcast with former teammate A. J. Mleczko.

== Awards and honors ==
- 1995 Concordia University Female Athlete of the Year (Sally Kemp Award)
- 1996 Bob Allen Women's Player of the Year Award
- 1998 Winter Olympics – gold medal
- 2002 Winter Olympics – silver medal
- On September 18, 2007, Granato was announced one of the four recipients of the 2007 Lester Patrick Trophy. She is a partner in BelaHockey, a company that creates hockey accessories for girls.
- In May 2008, Granato was inducted into the IIHF Hall of Fame with two other women's hockey players (Geraldine Heaney and Angela James) - the first women to be given such an honor.
- On August 12, 2008, it was announced that Granato would be inducted into the United States Hockey Hall of Fame, the first woman to be in the Hall. The induction ceremony took place on October 10, 2008, at the University of Denver.
- On November 8, 2010, Granato was inducted into the Hockey Hall of Fame. Granato and Angela James were the first female inductees.
- On September 20, 2018, Granato was inducted into the Rhode Island Hockey Hall of Fame.

== Personal life ==
Granato married former NHL star, Ray Ferraro, in 2004 and lives in Vancouver, British Columbia. They have two sons: Riley (born December 2006) and Reese (born December 2009). She is stepmother to Ferraro's sons from his first marriage, Matt and Landon. She has four brothers (including Don and Tony) and one sister.

== Career statistics ==
Career statistics are from Eliteprospects.com, or The Internet Hockey Database, or USA Hockey.

=== Regular season and playoffs ===
			Regular season					Playoffs
Season	Team	League	GP	G	A	Pts	PIM	GP	G	A	Pts	PIM
1989-90	Providence College	ECAC	24	24	22	46	—	—	—	—	—	—
1990-91	Providence College	ECAC	22	26	20	46	—	—	—	—	—	—
1991-92	Providence College	ECAC	25	48	32	80	—	—	—	—	—	—
1992-93	Providence College	ECAC	28	41	43	84	—	—	—	—	—	—
1995-96	Concordia University	CIAU	—	—	—	—	—	—	—	—	—	—
1996-97	Concordia University	CIAU	—	—	—	—	—	—	—	—	—	—
2002-03	Vancouver Griffins	NWHL	16	18	14	32	6	1	0	1	1	0
2004-05	British Columbia Breakers	WWHL	21	8	11	19	30	—	—	—	—	—
WWHL totals			21	8	11	19	30	—	—	—	—	—

=== International ===
Year	Team	Event	Result	GP	G	A	Pts	PIM
1990	USA	WC	2nd place, silver medalist(s)	5	9	5	14	4
1992	USA	WC	2nd place, silver medalist(s)	5	8	2	10	2
1994	USA	WC	2nd place, silver medalist(s)	5	5	7	12	6
1995	USA	Pacific Rim Championship	2nd place, silver medalist(s)	5	4	7	11	4
1996	USA	Pacific Rim Championship	2nd place, silver medalist(s)	5	6	3	9	0
1997	USA	WC	2nd place, silver medalist(s)	5	5	3	8	4
1997	USA	3 Nations Cup	1st place, gold medalist(s)	4	2	2	4	2
1998	USA	OG	1st place, gold medalist(s)	6	4	4	8	0
1998	USA	3 Nations Cup	2nd place, silver medalist(s)	4	0	2	2	4
1999	USA	WC	2nd place, silver medalist(s)	5	3	5	8	0
1999	USA	3 Nations Cup	2nd place, silver medalist(s)	5	3	3	6	2
2000	USA	WC	2nd place, silver medalist(s)	5	6	1	7	0
2000	USA	4 Nations Cup	2nd place, silver medalist(s)	4	4	4	8	—
2001	USA	WC	2nd place, silver medalist(s)	5	7	6	13	0
2002	USA	OG	2nd place, silver medalist(s)	5	6	4	10	0
2003	USA	4 Nations Cup	1st place, gold medalist(s)	4	4	0	4	2
2004	USA	WC	2nd place, silver medalist(s)	3	0	2	2	0
2004	USA	4 Nations Cup	2nd place, silver medalist(s)	4	0	0	0	—
2005	USA	WC	1st place, gold medalist(s)	5	1	3	4	2
Senior totals				88	77	63	140	30
