= Guo Wei (disambiguation) =

Guo Wei (郭威) (904–954) was the Chinese emperor of the Later Zhou dynasty.

Guo Wei may also refer to:

- Guo Wei (ice hockey) (born 1969), Chinese ice hockey player
- Guo Wei (parathlete) (born 1982), Chinese Paralympic athlete
- Guo Wei (speed skater) (born 1983), Chinese short track speed skater
- Guo Wei (businessman, born 1975), Chinese senior executive of Internet and Media for Kaixin001
- Way Kuo or Guo Wei (郭位; born 1951), Taiwanese professor at City University of Hong Kong
- Guo Wei (footballer) (born 1989), Chinese footballer
- Guo Wei (director) (1922–2014), Chinese film director
