= Stacy Wilson =

Canadian ice hockey player

- Born: May 12, 1965 (age 61) Moncton, New Brunswick, Canada
- Height: 5 ft 7 in (170 cm)
- Weight: 130 lb (59 kg; 9 st 4 lb)
- Position: Forward
- Shot: Left
- National team: Canada
- Playing career: 1986–1998
Medal record
Representing Canada
Women's ice hockey
Olympic Games
Silver medal – second place	1998 Nagano	Tournament
IIHF World Women's Championships
Gold medal – first place	1990 Canada	Tournament
Gold medal – first place	1992 Finland	Tournament
Gold medal – first place	1994 United States	Tournament
Gold medal – first place	1997 Canada	Tournament
Women's 3 Nations Cup
Gold medal – first place	1996
Silver medal – second place	1997
Women's Pacific Rim Championships
Gold medal – first place	1995 United States
Gold medal – first place	1996 Canada

Stacy Eleanor Wilson (born May 12, 1965) is a Canadian author and retired ice hockey forward. She captained the Canadian national women's hockey team, was assistant coach of the Minnesota Duluth Bulldogs and head coach of the Bowdoin College women's ice hockey team.

== Early life ==
Wilson was born in Moncton, New Brunswick, on May 12, 1965, to Trueman Townsend Wilson and Elizabeth Ann Wilson (née Beckwith). She grew up in the nearby village of Salisbury and attended JMA Armstrong High School. She graduated from Acadia University in 1987, with a bachelor's degree in physical education.

== Playing career ==
Wilson began her career by playing minor hockey with boys until reaching the bantam level. After her last year of bantam, she stopped playing hockey, instead pursusing badminton at the provincial and Maritime level.

=== Acadia University ===
By her second year at Acadia University, Wilson began playing hockey again. Along with other female hockey players, she helped to create a women's hockey club at the university. The team wore used Acadia varsity men's hockey sweaters and raised funds to play in a few tournaments. It took part in two provincial championship tournaments and represented Nova Scotia at the Women's National Championship in 1986 and 1987.

=== New Brunswick ===
Wilson graduated from Acadia University in 1987. She began to play senior women's hockey with the Moncton Blades (later known as the Maritime Blades). From 1986–87 to 1992–93, she was on Team New Brunswick at the National Women's Championships and was the leading scorer at the National Championships in 1986. She was named to the All-Star team in 1988 and was the most sportsmanlike player in 1990 and 1996. She earned MVP and leading scorer titles in 1990 in the New Brunswick Senior Women's Hockey League.

Wilson represented Team New Brunswick at the 1998 Esso Nationals, scoring two goals to defeat Team Saskatchewan and finish in fifth place.

=== Team Canada ===
At the 1990 World Championships in Ottawa, Ontario, Wilson led her team to a gold medal, scoring three goals and eight assists in five games. She was on the gold medal team at the 1992 World Championships in Tampere, Finland, but she was injured, scoring one goal and one assist in five games. She was also a member of the gold medal-winning team at the 1994 World Championships in Lake Placid, New York, scoring four goals and four assists in five games. She also played on the second-place Maritime Sports Blades at the 1995 National Championships, scoring six goals and six assists in six games en route to earning the most valuable player award.

Wilson was on the gold medal-winning teams at the 1995 and 1996 Pacific Rim championships in Richmond, British Columbia, and in San Jose, California. She captained the gold medal-winning team at the 1997 Ice Hockey World Championships in Kitchener, Ontario, scoring a goal and four assists in five games. At the 1997 National Championships, she won a medal as the game MVP. She had it cut into 20 pieces and shared with her teammates.

Wilson won the silver medal in the 1998 Winter Olympics in Nagano as the captain of the Canadian team. Her five assists in ice hockey at the 1998 Winter Olympics ranked second on the Canadian team behind Hayley Wickenheiser. She retired shortly afterward due to injuries.

== Coaching career ==
Wilson was assistant coach of the Minnesota Duluth Bulldogs women's ice hockey program from May 1999 to June 2004. During her tenure, the Bulldogs won three NCAA Championships.

Wilson was hired in May 2007, as the head coach of the Bowdoin College women's ice hockey program. She resigned as head coach on April 19, 2010, as a result of her decision to move back to New Brunswick.

Wilson was inducted into the Acadia University Hockey Hall of Fame in 1998, the only woman ever to be so honoured.

== Writing ==
In 2000, Wilson wrote a book entitled The Hockey Book for Girls, which was nominated for a Red Cedar Book Award.

A review of the book published by CM: Canadian Review of Materials gives it four stars out of five and notes: "Without bashing male hockey, this book provides support to girls who are trying to break into a field that has been male dominated."

A review in the School Library Journal stated: "While young athletes will glean a few pointers from this slim book, the information provided is somewhat limited...Unfortunately, the book is poorly written and some of the full-color photographs are small while others are unfocused."

== Personal life ==
Wilson has one brother, Shane Allison, and one sister, Shelley Anne. She volunteered with the New Brunswick women's hockey council.

== Statistics ==
=== International ===
Year	Team	Comp	GP	G	A	Pts	PIM	+/–
1990	Canada	WWHC	5	3	8	11	0
1992	Canada	WWHC	5	1	1	2	0
1994	Canada	WWHC	5	4	4	8	6
1995	Canada	WPRC	5	3	2	5	0
1996	Canada	WPRC	5	2	3	5	0
1997	Canada	TNC	5	0
1997	Canada	WWHC	5	1	4	5	4
1997	Canada	TNC	5	4	3	7	0
1998	Canada	OLY	6	1	5	6	0	9
TOTALS		WPRC	10	5	5	10	0
TOTALS		WWHC	20	9	17	26	10
TOTALS		OLY	6	1	5	6	0	9

== Awards and honours ==
- Acadia Sports Hall of Fame
- New Brunswick Sports Hall of Fame
- 2003 American Association of College Coaches' women's hockey coaching staff of the year.

Preceded by France Saint-Louis (1992-94)	Captain, Cdn National Women's Hockey Team; 1997-98	Succeeded by Therese Brisson (1999-2001)
