= Darryl Sittler =

Canadian ice hockey player (born 1950)

- Hockey Hall of Fame, 1989
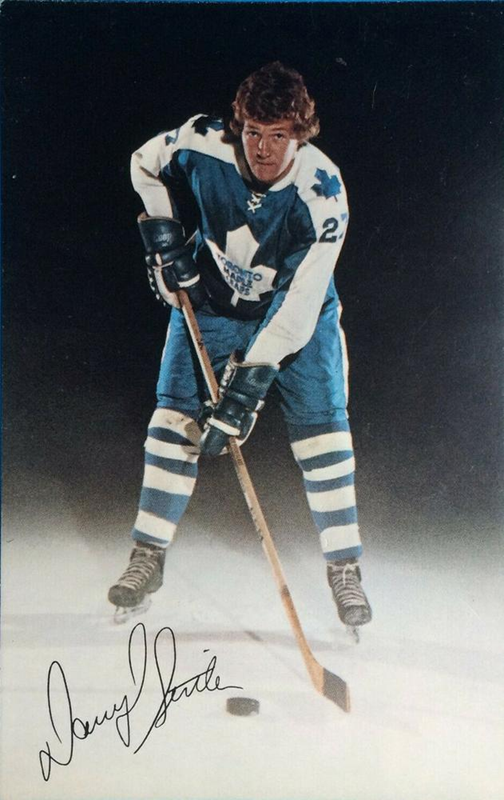
- Sittler with the Toronto Maple Leafs in 1971
- Born: September 18, 1950 (age 76) St. Jacobs, Ontario, Canada
- Height: 6 ft 0 in (183 cm)
- Weight: 190 lb (86 kg; 13 st 8 lb)
- Position: Centre
- Shot: Left
- Played for: Toronto Maple Leafs; Philadelphia Flyers; Detroit Red Wings
- National team: Canada
- NHL draft: 8th overall, 1970; Toronto Maple Leafs
- Playing career: 1970–1985
- Website: darrylsittler.ca
Medal record
Representing Canada
World Championships
Bronze medal – third place	1982 Finland
Bronze medal – third place	1983 Soviet Union
Canada Cup
Gold medal – first place	1976 Canada

Darryl Glen Sittler (born September 18, 1950) is a Canadian former professional ice hockey player who played in the National Hockey League (NHL) from 1970 until 1985 for the Toronto Maple Leafs, the Philadelphia Flyers and the Detroit Red Wings. He was elected to the Hockey Hall of Fame in 1989, the Ontario Sports Hall of Fame in 2003 and the Canadian Walk of Fame in 2016. In 2017 Sittler was named one of the '100 Greatest NHL Players' in history.

On February 7, 1976, Sittler set an NHL record for most points by an individual in one game when he scored ten points (six goals and four assists) against the Boston Bruins. He also remains the most recent NHL player to score six goals in one game.

== Playing career ==
=== Toronto Maple Leafs ===
Sittler grew up in St. Jacobs, Ontario, and played minor hockey in nearby Elmira. He was drafted out of the Junior C Elmira Sugar Kings by the London Nationals, soon renamed the London Knights, and played under coaches Turk Broda and Bep Guidolin.

Sittler was selected eighth overall by the Maple Leafs in the 1970 NHL Amateur Draft. He was named team captain on September 10, 1975, after Dave Keon left the team to play in the World Hockey Association following a contract dispute with Leafs owner Harold Ballard.

In his first season as captain, Sittler finished the season with 41 goals and 59 assists, being the first Leaf ever to reach the 100 point mark. A few months later, he tied the playoff record for most goals in one game, with five against the Philadelphia Flyers. That summer, in the inaugural Canada Cup, he scored in overtime to win the final series for Team Canada over Czechoslovakia.

On February 7, 1976, in a game between Toronto and Boston at Maple Leaf Gardens, Sittler set an NHL record that still stands by tallying six goals and adding four assists for ten points (eclipsing Maurice Richard's record of eight, set in 1944). All his points were scored against rookie goalie Dave Reece in an 11–4 Maple Leaf victory.

In 1977–78, Sittler's 117 points ranked him third in regular-season scoring behind Guy Lafleur and Bryan Trottier, and also earned him a Second Team All-Star selection. Sittler's scoring totals remained a Leafs record until being surpassed by Doug Gilmour in 1992–93.

The 1978–79 season saw Sittler suffer some knee problems and miss ten games. It was also the year Leafs owner Ballard fired and then rehired coach Roger Neilson, a process which saw Sittler lobby on the players' behalf for Neilson's reinstatement.

Sittler's relationship with Ballard slowly deteriorated, particularly after Ballard hired Punch Imlach as general manager in July 1979. Imlach and Ballard both had strained relations with NHLPA executive director Alan Eagleson, who, as a player agent, represented more than a dozen Leafs, including Sittler and his best friend and linemate, Lanny McDonald. Imlach believed Sittler had too much influence on the team and tried to undermine his authority with the players. When Sittler and goaltender Mike Palmateer agreed to appear on the TV show Showdown, as negotiated by the NHLPA, Imlach went to court to obtain an injunction to stop them. When Imlach said he was open to offers for Sittler from other teams, Eagleson said it would cost $500,000 to get Sittler to waive the no-trade clause in his contract. So, instead of trading Sittler, Imlach sent McDonald to the woeful Colorado Rockies on December 29, 1979. In response, Sittler ripped the captain's C off his sweater, later commenting a captain had to be the go-between with players and management, and he no longer had any communication with management. Ballard would liken Sittler's actions to burning the Canadian flag.

Through the summer, Ballard insisted Sittler would not be back with the Leafs. But before the start of the 1980–81 season, Sittler and Ballard appeared at a news conference described as "all smiles and buddy-buddy" to announce that Sittler would be at training camp. He showed up with the C back on his sweater, reassuming the role of team captain. Sittler had arranged the talks with Ballard on his own. The discussions took place with Imlach hospitalized following his second heart attack. At the news conference, Ballard said the real battle had been between Imlach and Eagleson, and Sittler just got caught in the crossfire.

During the 1981–82 season, Ballard considered Imlach's health to be too poor for him to continue as general manager. But even with Imlach gone, Sittler's relationship with the Leafs worsened to the point where he told Ballard and acting general manager Gerry McNamara at the end of November he would waive his no-trade clause if he was sent to the Flyers or the Minnesota North Stars. In the first week of December, Eagleson agreed to terms with Flyers' owner Ed Snider and North Stars' general manager Lou Nanne. But it took another seven weeks for the Leafs to make a deal. During that time, Sittler added the Islanders and Buffalo Sabres to the list of teams he could be traded to. On January 5, 1982, on advice from his physician, Sittler walked out on the Leafs, saying he was "mentally depressed" because a trade was taking so long to complete.

=== Philadelphia Flyers and Detroit Red Wings ===
Finally, on January 20, 1982, the 31-year-old Sittler was traded to the Flyers for Rich Costello plus the Hartford Whalers' second-round pick in the 1982 draft (used by the Leafs to select Peter Ihnačák), and future considerations, which ended up being Ken Strong. Only Ihnačák would play regularly for the Leafs. In 1980, Imlach had rejected an offer from Philadelphia, who were said to be willing to trade Rick MacLeish and André Dupont for Sittler.

With the Flyers in 1982–83, Sittler earned his fourth All-Star game appearance. He returned to the Flyers the following season. Before the 1984–85 season, Sittler was told he would be named the Flyers' team captain. On the day the announcement was to be made—Sittler even had a brief speech prepared—he was instead told by Flyers' newly appointed general manager Bobby Clarke he had been traded to the Detroit Red Wings for Murray Craven and Joe Paterson. It was this incident that Sittler described as the biggest disappointment of his life. "Clarke can't come close to realizing how much he hurt me, and my family, that day," he wrote in his 1991 autobiography. Sittler contemplated retirement and did not report to the Wings for a few days, but then joined the team. He had an unproductive season, struggling to get ice time under coach Nick Polano, and finishing the year with the worst goals-per-game average of his NHL career. The Red Wings bought out Sittler's contract after the end of the season. He received a one-year contract offer from the Vancouver Canucks, but decided to retire.

== After retirement from playing ==
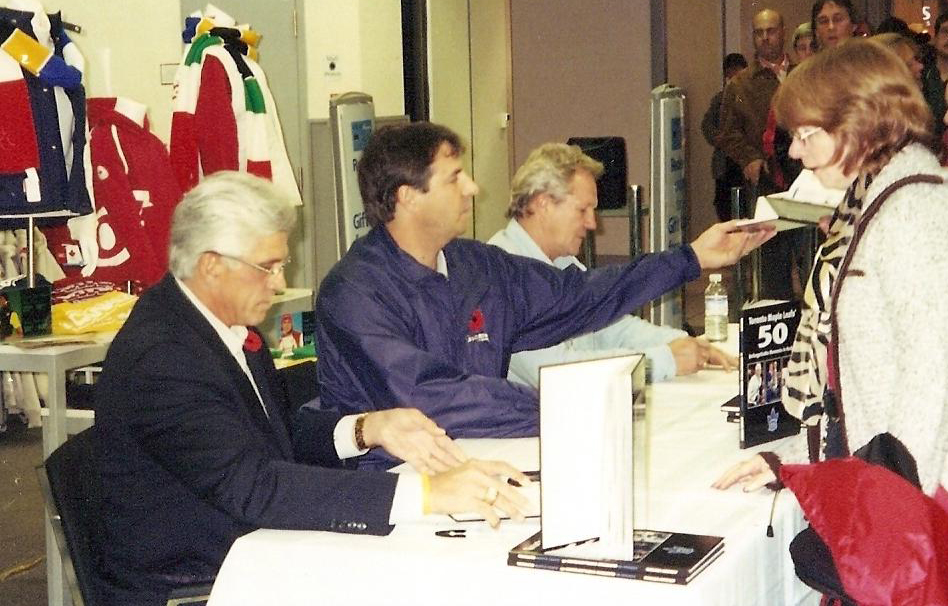
Sittler (right) signing books with Rick Vaive (left) and author Mike Bynum (centre) at the Oshawa Centre in 2005

Sittler was elected to the Hockey Hall of Fame in 1989. In 1991, a year after Ballard died, he rejoined the Maple Leafs organization as a consultant under general manager Cliff Fletcher, also performing public relations duties for the team on an ongoing basis. In 1998, he was ranked number 93 on The Hockey News' list of the 100 Greatest Hockey Players. On February 8, 2003, the Leafs honoured Sittler by adding a banner with his number 27 to those already hanging in the Air Canada Centre for other Leafs greats. In a ceremony, Sittler, with his three grown children at his side, paid tribute to his wife Wendy, who had died of cancer the previous year.

In 2004, Sittler appeared as himself in a brief cameo in season two, episode two of the Canadian sitcom, Corner Gas. The episode centred around the disputed ownership of one of Sittler's rookie cards.

Vancouver songwriters Dan Swinimer and Jeff Johnson wrote a country song commemorating Sittler's 60th birthday called "The Darryl Sittler Song".

Sittler travels across Canada doing public speaking, autograph signings and appearances for various companies, charities and organizations. Sittler also serves as a director to a number of mineral exploration companies, including Wallbridge Mining.

Sittler was inducted into Canada's Walk of Fame on August 23, 2016. On October 15, 2016, number 27 worn by Sittler and Frank Mahovlich was officially retired by the Toronto Maple Leafs, along with the numbers of 16 other players, to celebrate the team's 100th season.

== Personal life ==
He is the older brother of Gary Sittler who played five games in the World Hockey Association during the 1974–75 WHA season.

His son, Ryan Sittler, was drafted by the Philadelphia Flyers in the first round of the 1992 NHL Entry Draft, played hockey at the University of Michigan, and represented the United States at the World Junior Championships on three occasions.

His daughter Meaghan Sittler played four seasons at Colby College and on the United States national women's hockey team.

In July 1980, Sittler presented Terry Fox with his NHL All-Star Game jersey in Nathan Phillips Square in front of a crowd of over 10,000 supporters. Fox had said Sittler was one of his favourite athletes.

== Career statistics ==
=== Regular season and playoffs ===
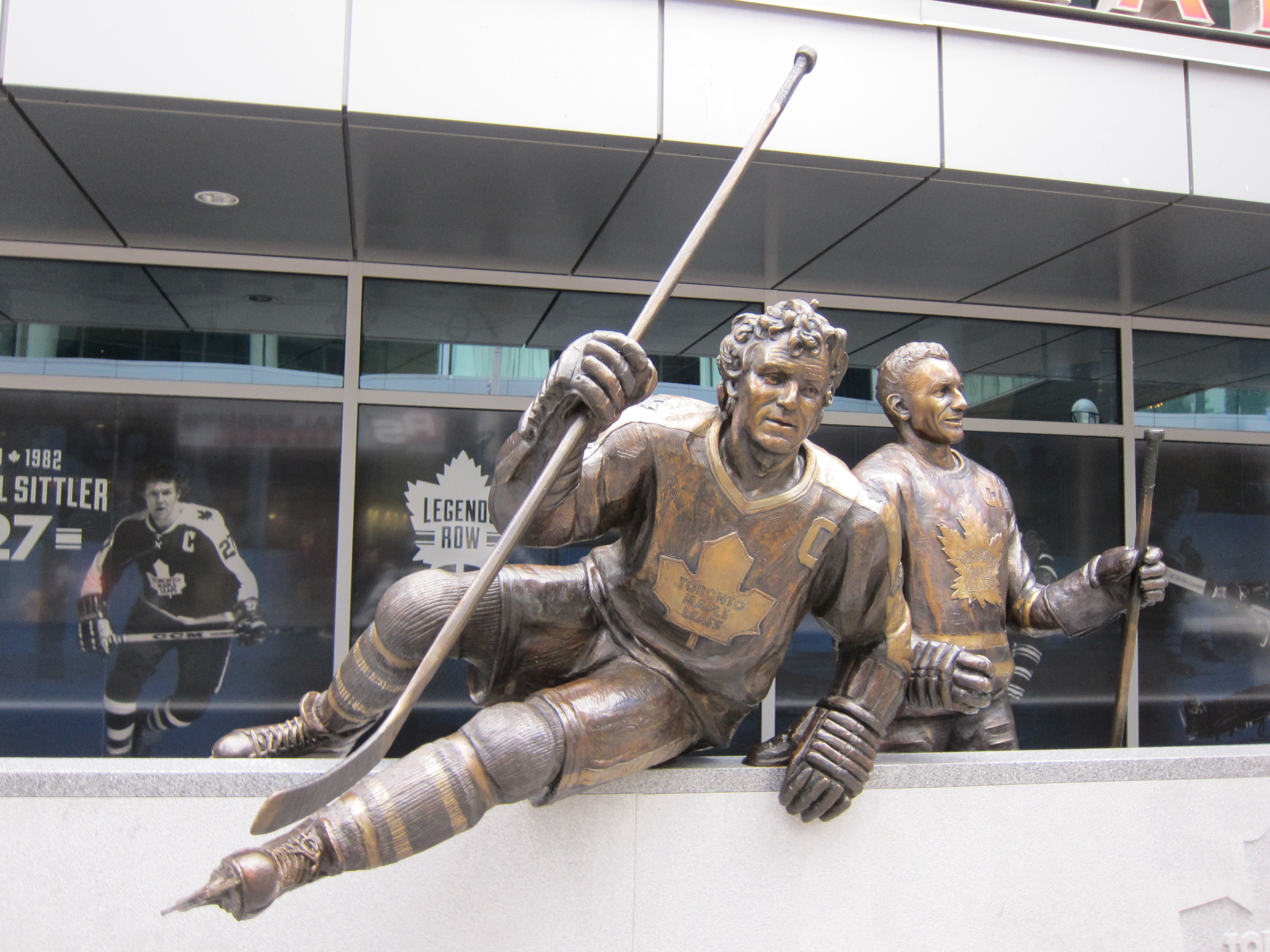
Sittler's statue at Legends Row in front of Scotiabank Arena, erected in 2014

			Regular season					Playoffs
Season	Team	League	GP	G	A	Pts	PIM	GP	G	A	Pts	PIM
1967–68	London Nationals	OHA-Jr.	54	22	41	63	84	5	5	2	7	6
1968–69	London Knights	OHA-Jr.	53	34	65	99	90	6	2	5	7	11
1969–70	London Knights	OHA-Jr.	54	42	48	90	126	12	4	12	16	32
1970–71	Toronto Maple Leafs	NHL	49	10	8	18	37	6	2	1	3	31
1971–72	Toronto Maple Leafs	NHL	74	15	17	32	44	3	0	0	0	2
1972–73	Toronto Maple Leafs	NHL	78	29	48	77	69	—	—	—	—	—
1973–74	Toronto Maple Leafs	NHL	78	38	46	84	55	4	2	1	3	6
1974–75	Toronto Maple Leafs	NHL	72	36	44	80	47	7	2	1	3	15
1975–76	Toronto Maple Leafs	NHL	79	41	59	100	90	10	5	7	12	19
1976–77	Toronto Maple Leafs	NHL	73	38	52	90	89	9	5	16	21	4
1977–78	Toronto Maple Leafs	NHL	80	45	72	117	100	13	3	8	11	12
1978–79	Toronto Maple Leafs	NHL	70	36	51	87	69	6	5	4	9	17
1979–80	Toronto Maple Leafs	NHL	73	40	57	97	62	3	1	2	3	10
1980–81	Toronto Maple Leafs	NHL	80	43	53	96	77	3	0	0	0	4
1981–82	Toronto Maple Leafs	NHL	38	18	20	38	24	—	—	—	—	—
1981–82	Philadelphia Flyers	NHL	35	14	18	32	50	4	3	1	4	6
1982–83	Philadelphia Flyers	NHL	80	43	40	83	60	3	1	0	1	4
1983–84	Philadelphia Flyers	NHL	76	27	36	63	38	3	0	2	2	7
1984–85	Detroit Red Wings	NHL	61	11	16	27	37	2	0	2	2	0
NHL totals			1,096	484	637	1,121	948	76	29	45	74	137

=== International ===
Year	Team	Event	Results	GP	G	A	Pts	PIM
1976	Canada	CC	1st place, gold medalist(s)	7	4	2	6	4
1982	Canada	WC	3rd place, bronze medalist(s)	10	4	3	7	2
1983	Canada	WC	3rd place, bronze medalist(s)	10	3	1	4	12
Senior totals				27	11	6	17	18

== See also ==
- List of NHL statistical leaders
- List of NHL players with 1,000 games played
- List of NHL players with 1,000 points
- List of players with 5 or more goals in an NHL game

Preceded by Ernie Moser	Toronto Maple Leafs first-round draft pick 1970	Succeeded by George Ferguson
Preceded by Dave Keon	Toronto Maple Leafs captain 1975–1979, 1980–1982	Succeeded by Rick Vaive
