= Meaghan Sittler =

Canadian-born American ice hockey player (born 1976)

- Born: March 12, 1976 (age 50) Mississauga, Ontario, Canada
- Height: 5 ft 6 in (168 cm)
- Weight: 142 lb (64 kg; 10 st 2 lb)
- Position: Forward
- Shot: Left
- ECAC NWHL team: Colby College; Brampton Thunder
- National team: United States
- Playing career: 1994–2004
Medal record
Representing United States
Women's ice hockey
Women's Pacific Rim Championships
Silver medal – second place	1996 Canada	Tournament

Meaghan Sittler (born March 12, 1976) is a Canadian-born American former ice hockey player for the Colby College White Mules women's ice hockey program and the Brampton Thunder of the NWHL. She is Colby's all-time leading scorer with 199 goals and 121 assists in 85 games. She is the daughter of former Toronto Maple Leafs player Darryl Sittler and the sister of 1992 NHL Draft pick, Ryan Sittler. Although she was born in Canada, she resided in East Amherst, New York when she competed internationally for the United States.

== Playing career ==
After her freshman year at the Nichols School in Buffalo, Sittler was invited to try out for the under-18 girls United States national hockey team. During the 1995–96 season, Meaghan Sittler led the NCAA with 41 goals and 40 assists in 21 games. In her final 13 games, Sittler had eight hat tricks and either scored or assisted on 82 of 111 White Mules goals. During the 1997-98 NCAA season, Sittler was eighth in the nation in scoring with 37 points (18 goals, 19 assists). On October 18, 1997, Sittler was part of the ECAC All-Star team that played the United States national women's hockey team.

In 1996, Sittler played for Team USA at the Pacific Rim women's hockey championship. She followed that up in 1998 and 1999 by playing for Team USA at the Three Nations Cup. From 1999 to 2000, she was with the US Select Team. With the Brampton Thunder, Sittler competed for Team Ontario in the 2003 Esso Women's Nationals.

On May 30, 2010, Sittler opened the Boogha Boogha Inspiration Studio, just blocks from the Lorne Park neighbourhood where she lived as a young girl.

== Awards and honors ==
- 1995 ECAC Rookie of the Year
- 1996 ECAC co-player of the Year
- 1996 All-ECAC selection
- 1996 NCAA scoring champion
- January 29, 1996: ECAC Player of the Week
- February 12, 1996: ECAC Player of the Week
- 1996-97 All-ECAC selection
- 1998 American Women's College Hockey Alliance All-Americans
- 1998 ECAC scoring champion
- 1998 All-ECAC selection
- 1998 ECAC co-player of the year
- 1998 Top 10 Finalist, Patty Kazmaier Award
