= 1997 IIHF Women's World Championship =

Tournament details
- Host country: Canada
- Venue(s): Brantford, Brampton, Hamilton, Kitchener, London, Mississauga, North York (in 7 host cities)
- Dates: March 31 – April 6, 1997
- Opened by: Roméo LeBlanc
- Teams: 8

Final positions
- Champions: Canada (4th title)
- Runners-up: United States
- Third place: Finland
- Fourth place: China

Tournament statistics
- Games played: 20
- Goals scored: 129 (6.45 per game)
- Attendance: 60,418 (3,021 per game)
- Scoring leader: (Finland) Riikka Nieminen 10 points

The 1997 IIHF Women's World Championships was held March 31 – April 6, 1997, in seven Canadian cities all in the Province of Ontario. Team Canada won their fourth consecutive gold medal at the World Championships defeating the United States, however this time the United States took Canada in the closest final so far, losing in overtime. Finland picked up their fourth consecutive bronze medal, with a win over China who made the Semi-Final for the second consecutive year.

This tournament also served as the qualifier for the Nagano Olympics, with the top five finishers joining host Japan. Sweden defeated first Switzerland, then Russia, in the consolation round to join the four semi-finalists in the Olympics.

== Qualification ==
The following teams participated in the championship. Qualification was the top three from the 1996 Pacific Rim Championship, and the top five from the 1996 European Championship.

- Pacific Rim Championship:
  - Canada
  - China
  - United States
- European Championship:
  - Finland
  - Norway
  - Russia
  - Switzerland
  - Sweden

== Final tournament ==
The eight participating teams were divided up into two seeded groups as below. The teams played each other once in a single round robin format. The top two teams from the group proceeded to the Final Round, while the remaining teams played in the consolation round.

== First round ==
=== Group A ===
==== Standings ====
Pos	Team	Pld	W	D	L	GF	GA	GD	Pts	Qualification
1	Canada	3	3	0	0	22	2	+20	6	Advanced to Final round
2	China	3	2	0	1	18	12	+6	4	Advanced to Final round
3	Russia	3	0	1	2	6	18	−12	1	Sent to Consolation round
4	Switzerland	3	0	1	2	6	20	−14	1	Sent to Consolation round

==== Results ====
All times local

March 31, 1997; 7:00 pm	China	6 – 2 (3 - 0, 2 - 2, 1 - 0)	Russia	Hamilton; Attendance: 750

Hong S. 7:36; Guo W. 11:22; Yang 12:26; Hong D. 27:23; Hong D. 37:03; Hong Sang 40:36 / Goals / E. Pashkevich 20:06; L. Mishina 33:51

March 31, 1997; 7:30 pm	Canada	6 – 0 (1 - 0, 2 - 0, 3 - 0)	Switzerland	Kitchener; Attendance: 3,889

V. Sunohara 07:36; H. Wickenheiser 21:25; D. Goyette 32:04; N. Drolet 58:28; A. James 59:36; R. Fahey 59:51 / Goals

April 1, 1997; 7:00 pm	China	11 – 3 (5 - 2, 3 - 0, 3 - 1)	Switzerland	Mississauga; Attendance: 1,207

Zhang L. 4:06; Liu H. 7:44; Zhang L. 8:27; Guo L. 8:54; Gong M. 11:47; Zhang J. 28:47; Wang W. 30:24; Liu H. 38:19; Guo W. 50:52; Liu H. 54:38; Yang X. 59:17 / Goals / M. Walder 9:42; D. Wyss 19:26; Penalty Shot 59:17

April 1, 1997; 7:30 pm	Canada	9 – 1 (3 - 0, 3 - 0, 3 - 1)	Russia	Kitchener; Attendance: 5,559

J. Hefford 11:06; V. Sunohara 14:19; L. Letendre 19:49; S. Wilson 23:52; L. Schuller 24:57; H. Wickenheiser 36:54; K. Nyrstrom 42:53; D. Goyette 44:49; F. St. Louis 45:49 / Goals / M. Misropian 48:43

April 3, 1997; 7:30 pm	Switzerland	3 – 3 (1 - 0, 2 - 3, 0 - 0)	Russia	North York; Attendance: 1,089

M. Noethiger 8:20; R. Kuenzle 25:19; M. Baechler 27:01 / Goals / E. Pachkevitch 28:31; V. Simanova 34:03; E. Bialkovskaya 36:52

April 3, 1997; 7:30 pm	Canada	7 – 1 (5 - 0, 1 - 0, 1 - 1)	China	Kitchener; Attendance: 5,457

C. Campbell 8:34; L. Dupuis 9:30; H. Wickenheiser 12:29; V. Sunohara 13:36; C. Campbell 14:56; G. Heaney 23:20; L. Dupuis 56:55 / Goals / Guo W. 44:48

=== Group B ===
==== Standings ====
Pos	Team	Pld	W	D	L	GF	GA	GD	Pts	Qualification
1	United States	3	2	1	0	20	3	+17	5	Advanced to Final round
2	Finland	3	2	1	0	18	3	+15	5	Advanced to Final round
3	Sweden	3	0	1	2	2	17	−15	1	Sent to Consolation round
4	Norway	3	0	1	2	2	19	−17	1	Sent to Consolation round

==== Results ====
All times local

March 31, 1997; 4:00 pm	Norway	0 – 7 (0 - 2, 0 - 3, 0 - 2)	United States	Kitchener; Attendance: 3,100

Goals / S. Looney 1:51; S. O'Sullivian 5:19; L. Baker 26:55; C. Granato 29:05; K. O'Leary 34:25; G. Ulion 42:19; S. Looney 46:21

March 31, 1997; 4:00 pm	Finland	5 – 0 (3 - 0, 1 - 0, 1 - 0)	Sweden	Brampton

T. Reima 00:37; P. Salo 03:58; T. Paananen 04:51; M. Ihalainen 20:32; T. Reima 56:09 / Goals

April 1, 1997; 4:00 pm	Norway	2 – 2 (2 - 0, 0 - 1, 0 - 1)	Sweden	Kitchener; Attendance: 3,068

T. Larson 08:59; B. Lersbryggen 17:17 / Goals / M. Rooth 36:56; G. Andersson 58:00

April 1, 1997; 7:00 pm	Finland	3 – 3 (1 - 2, 0 - 1, 2 - 0)	United States	Brantford

T. Reima 17:38; R. Nieminen 51:56; S. Krooks 54:36 / Goals / T. Dunn 4:27; C. Granato 19:18; C. Granato 31:11

April 3, 1997; 7:00 pm	Norway	0 – 10 (0 - 3, 0 - 3, 0 - 4)	Finland	Kitchener; Attendance: 3,401

Goals / R. Nieminen 03:13; R. Nieminen 11:06; J. Ikonen 16:12; M. Ihalainen 33:43; K. Riipi 34:47; K. Hänninen 37:12; R. Nieminen 40:52; A. Haanpää 47:43; T. Reima 52:11; A. Haanpää 59:55

April 3, 1997; 7:00 pm	United States	10 – 0 (4 - 0, 3 - 0, 3 - 0)	Sweden	London; Attendance: 3,472

K. King 5:06; L. Brown-Miller 11:22; C. Granato 12:24; K. Bye 18:08; C. Granato 20:20; S. Whyte 20:37; K. Bye 39:09; S. Looney 42:25; T. Mounsey 46:05; K. Bye 50:36 / Goals

== Playoff round ==
=== Consolation round 5–8 place ===
April 4, 1997; 4:00 pm	Sweden	7 – 1 (2 - 0, 1 - 1, 4 - 0)	Switzerland	Kitchener; Attendance: 3,301

M. Rooth 1:49; Å. Elfving 08:24; E. Holst 35:49; Å. Elfving 43:38; E. Holst 49:36; K. Bergstrand 53:50; G. Andersson 54:07 / Goals / R. Fuhrer 21:07

April 4, 1997; 7:30 pm	Russia	2 – 1 (1 - 1, 1 - 0, 0 - 0)	Norway	Kitchener; Attendance: 2,849

O. Tretiakova 8:07; E. Pashkevich 38:38 / Goals / B. Lersbryggen 17:15

=== Consolation round 7–8 place ===
April 6, 1997; 2:00 pm	Switzerland	1 – 0 (0 - 0, 0 - 0, 1 - 0)	Norway	Kitchener; Attendance: 565

K. Lehmann 46:47 / Goals

=== Consolation round 5–6 place ===
April 6, 1997; 1:00 pm	Russia	1 – 3 (1 - 0, 0 - 2, 0 - 1)	Sweden	Kitchener; Attendance: 2,471

S. Nikolaeva 1:10 / Goals / G. Andersson 23:33; C. Kempe 23:33; C. Kempe 50:29

=== Final round ===
Semi finals 5 April 1997
A1	Canada	2
B2	Finland	1
B1	United States	6
A2	China	0

Finals; 6 April 1997
Canada	4
United States	3
Bronze Medal Game
Finland	3
China	0

=== Semifinals ===
April 5, 1997; 1:00 pm	Canada	2 – 1 (0 - 1, 1 - 0, 1 - 0)	Finland	Kitchener; Attendance: 4,963

H. Wickenheiser 25:27; V. Sunohara 59:36 / Goals / K. Hänninen 7:00

April 5, 1997; 5:00 pm	United States	6 – 0 (2 - 0, 2 - 0, 2 - 0)	China	Kitchener; Attendance: 3,832

S. Looney; T. Mounsey; K. Bye; S. O'Sullvian; L. Baker; G. Ulion / Goals

=== Match for third place ===
April 6, 1997; 4:00 pm	Finland	3 – 0 (0 - 0, 0 - 0, 3 - 0)	China	Kitchener

T. Paananen 53:37; Unknown; Unknown / Goals

=== Final ===
April 6, 1997	Canada	4 – 3 (1-0, 1-2, 1-1, 1-0)	United States	Kitchener; Attendance: 6,247

Referee:
(Switzerland) Sandra Dombrowski

N. Drolet (S. Wilson, J. Diduck) - 19:36	1-0
	1-1	27:15 - A. Blahoski (L. Baker, K. King)
A. James (C. Campbell, H. Wickenheiser) (PP) - 29:21	2-1
	2-2	34:14 - S. O'Sullivan (C. Granato, Mounsey) (PP)
N. Drolet (J. Hefford, G. Heaney) (PP) - 40:11	3-2
	3-3	42:26 - K. King (C. Granato, A. Blahoski)
N. Drolet (H. Wickenheiser, C. Campbell) - 72:59	4-3

35
Shots
27

== Champions ==
1997 IIHF World Women Championship winners

Canada
4th title

== Tournament Awards ==
The following was selected as the All-Star team of the tournament:

- Goaltender - Patricia Sautter Switzerland
- Defence - Cassie Campbell Canada
- Defence - Kelly O'Leary United States
- Forward - Hayley Wickenheiser Canada
- Forward - Cammi Granato United States
- Forward - Riikka Nieminen Finland

== Final standings ==
Rk.	Team	Notes
1st place, gold medalist(s)	Canada	Qualified for the 1998 Winter Olympic Games
2nd place, silver medalist(s)	United States	Qualified for the 1998 Winter Olympic Games
3rd place, bronze medalist(s)	Finland	Qualified for the 1998 Winter Olympic Games
4.	China	Qualified for the 1998 Winter Olympic Games
5.	Sweden	Qualified for the 1998 Winter Olympic Games
6.	Russia	Qualified for the 1999 World Championships Qualification Tournament
7.	Switzerland	Qualified for the 1999 World Championships Qualification Tournament
8.	Norway	Qualified for the 1999 World Championships Qualification Tournament

== Scoring leaders ==
Player	GP	G	A	Pts
(Finland) Riikka Nieminen	5	5	5	10
(Canada) Hayley Wickenheiser	5	4	5	9
(United States) Cammi Granato	5	5	3	8
(Finland) Tiia Reima	5	4	4	8
(Canada) Cassie Campbell	5	2	6	8
(Canada) Nancy Drolet	5	4	2	6
(United States) Shelley Looney	5	4	2	6
(United States) Karyn Bye	5	4	2	6
(China) Liu Hongmei	5	3	3	6
(China) Guo Wei	5	3	3	6
