= CEFCU Stadium =

Stadium at San Jose State University

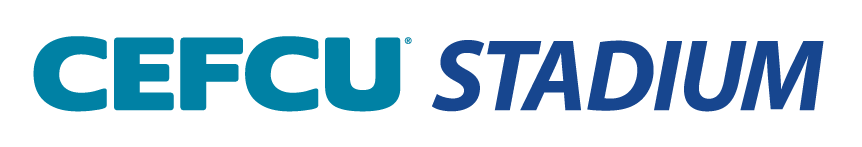

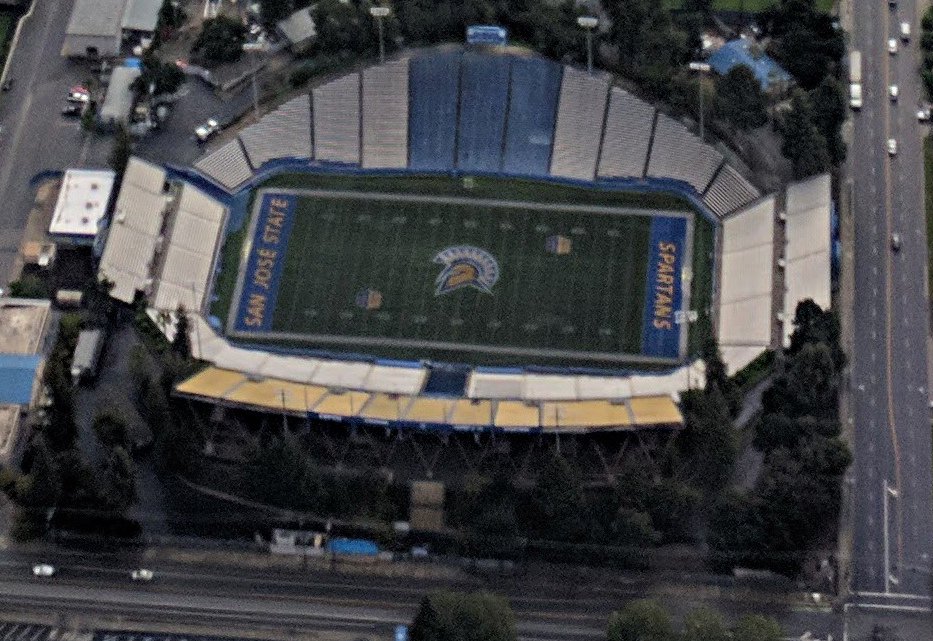
- Aerial View

- Location in the United States Location in California
- Interactive map of CEFCU Stadium
- Former names: Spartan Stadium (1933–2015)
- Address: 1257 S. 10th Street
- Location: San Jose, California, U.S.
- Coordinates: 37°19′11″N 121°52′6″W
- Owner: San Jose State University
- Operator: San Jose State University
- Capacity: 18,203 (2021–present); 21,530 (2019–2020); 30,456 (1998–2018); 31,218 (1985–1997); 18,155 (1948–1984); 11,000 (1937–1947); 8,500 (1936); 4,000 (1933–1935)
- Surface: AstroTurf (2017–present); FieldTurf (2009–2017); Natural grass (1933–2008)
- Public transit: Tamien

Construction
- Groundbreaking: 1933
- Opened: 1933; 93 years ago
- Expanded: 1936–1937, 1948, 1985
- Cost: US $2.25 million (1985 expansion)

Tenants
- San Jose State Spartans (NCAA) (1933–present); San Jose Earthquakes (NASL/WSA) (1974–1988); San Francisco Bay Blackhawks/San Jose Hawks (WSA/APSL/USISL) (1989–1993); San Jose Clash/Earthquakes (MLS) (1996–2005); Bay Area/San Jose CyberRays (WUSA) (2001–2003); Silicon Valley Football Classic (NCAA) (2000–2004); San Francisco Dragons (MLL) (2008); California Redwoods (UFL) (2009)

CEFCU ('sef-kyü) Stadium, formerly known as Spartan Stadium, is an outdoor athletic stadium located in the Spartan Keyes neighborhood of San Jose, California. Owned by San José State University, the venue is the longtime home of Spartan football; it also hosts the university's commencement ceremony on Memorial Day weekend, and occasional high school football games. Known as Spartan Stadium for over eight decades, it was renamed in 2016.

CEFCU Stadium was the home of the San Jose Earthquakes (originally San Jose Clash) of Major League Soccer from the league's inception in 1996 through the 2005 season. Other tenants have included the original San Jose Earthquakes of the North American Soccer League from 1974 to 1984, the San Jose CyberRays of the Women's United Soccer Association from 2001 to 2003, and the San Francisco Dragons of Major League Lacrosse in 2008. Soccer Bowl '75 was also held at CEFCU.

During the winter and spring of 2009, the stadium's natural grass playing field was removed and replaced with FieldTurf, a new generation of artificial turf with a crumb rubber and sand infill. This improvement resulted in significant savings to the university in water use, fertilizer, seed and labor. The FieldTurf playing surface was later replaced with AstroTurf Rhino Blend in 2017. The playing field is aligned north-northwest to south-southeast, at an approximate elevation of 100 feet (30 m) above sea level.

The stadium also received significant upgrades to the scoreboard and sound system in 2011 and 2020. This included installation of an HD video screen by Daktronics at the south end of the stadium in 2011, and a new, much larger video board at the north end in 2020.

== Stadium history ==
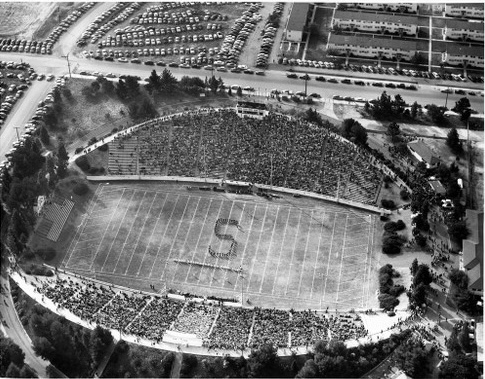
Spartan Stadium, 1950s

CEFCU stadium officially opened in 1933 as a 4,000-seat facility. The stadium featured large berms on the east, west, north and south sides of the field, which gave the stadium a "sunken bowl" appearance. The stadium's seating capacity was increased to 8,500 in 1936, and later expanded incrementally to a total seating capacity of just over 18,000 by 1948. The most recent additions came in the 1980s when the capacity of the stadium was expanded from approximately 18,000 to just over 31,000 by adding end zone bleachers, an upper deck and boxes on the west side.

In 1998, the field was widened and other renovations were carried out for the San Jose Earthquakes soccer team in accordance with official FIFA regulations. As a result of these renovations, parts of the stands closest to the playing field were removed, thus lowering available seating for all sports to 30,456.

On January 13, 2007, the San Jose Mercury News reported that the city of San Jose, San Jose State University and the San Jose Earthquakes owners were in negotiations to demolish Spartan Stadium and build a new stadium just to the east. The new facility, to have 22,000 permanent seats but be expandable to a capacity of 30,000 for single games, would have been privately built by Lewis Wolff and John Fisher, the primary owners of the Earthquakes, with San Jose State providing the needed land. Additionally, the team and the university would build community soccer fields across Senter Road in Kelley Park using San Jose municipal bond money that had been approved years earlier for the purpose but never spent. The plan was for the new version of the San Jose Earthquakes to play in Spartan Stadium during the 2008 MLS season, then move into the new stadium in 2009. Plans for the stadium collapsed on April 19, 2007 after the Earthquakes and SJSU could not come to an agreement on revenue sharing.

Seating capacity remained at 30,456 until 2019, when it was temporarily reduced to 21,520 as part of a massive east-side stadium renovation project that included construction of the $70 million Spartan Athletic Center.

In August 2016, Citizens Equity First Credit Union purchased sole naming rights to Spartan Stadium for $8.7 million. The deal between CEFCU and San José State University will last for 15 years. SJSU was the first university in the California State University system and second university in the state of California to strike such a deal. The CEFCU sponsorship deal marked the third such arrangement among the 12 Mountain West Conference football members. The $8.7 million payout will primarily be used for athletic scholarships, athletics operations, and athletics facilities.

=== Spartan Athletics Center and east-side renovations ===
A CEFCU Stadium east-side building addition was completed in August 2023 at an approximate cost of $70 million. Known as the Spartan Athletics Center, the 55,000 square-foot, multi-story facility houses a new football operations center, locker rooms, offices, meeting and training rooms and a sports medicine center. The facility also includes soccer team offices and locker rooms, as well as dining and hospitality facilities, event spaces and premium viewing areas.

The east-side stadium renovation has temporarily reduced seating capacity at CEFCU Stadium from just over 30,000 to 21,520. Approximately 9,000 seats were removed from the stadium in 2019 to make way for the new building. This includes virtually all of the east-side stadium seating and some of the north end zone bleachers. The north end zone bleachers were removed to make way for construction of a new state-of-the-art video scoreboard and outdoor bar and lounge area. The new scoreboard was completed in 2020.

As of 2023, a second phase of the east-side building and renovation project remains in the planning stages. The second phase is aimed at replacing spectator seating that was removed to make way for the SAC.

== Other uses ==
The now defunct NCAA Silicon Valley Football Classic bowl game was held at CEFCU Stadium from 2000 to 2004.

CEFCU Stadium has hosted numerous FIFA events. Most notably the stadium was used as one of the venues for the 1999 Women's World Cup. Additionally in 1999, the stadium was the host site of the 1999 NCAA Women's College Cup.

The stadium previously hosted commencement ceremonies of San José State University every spring, as well as musical concerts throughout the year.

== International soccer matches ==
Date	Competition	Team	Res	Team	Crowd
February 14, 1986	International Friendly	Mexico	1–2	East Germany	6,000
May 16, 1998	International Friendly	United States	0–0	North Macedonia	23,861
November 6, 1998	International Friendly	United States	0–0	Australia	15,074
September 27, 2000	International Friendly	Mexico	1–0	Bolivia	30,154
June 2, 2007	International Friendly	United States	4–1	China	20,821

=== 1999 FIFA Women's World Cup ===
Date	Competition	Team	Res	Team	Crowd
June 19, 1999	Group C	Japan	1–1	Canada	23,298
June 19, 1999	Group D	Sweden	1–2	China	23,298
June 30, 1999	Quarterfinals	China	2–0	Russia	21,411
June 30, 1999	Quarterfinals	Norway	3–1	Sweden	21,411

== Gallery ==
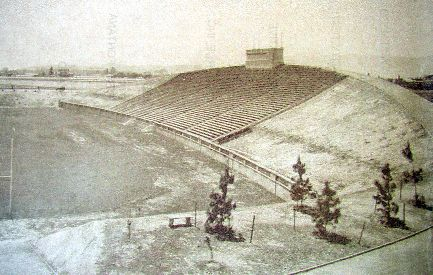
Spartan Stadium, San Jose, California — 1933

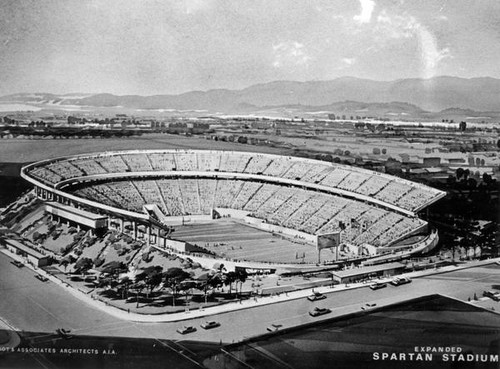
Proposed Expansion — 1960s

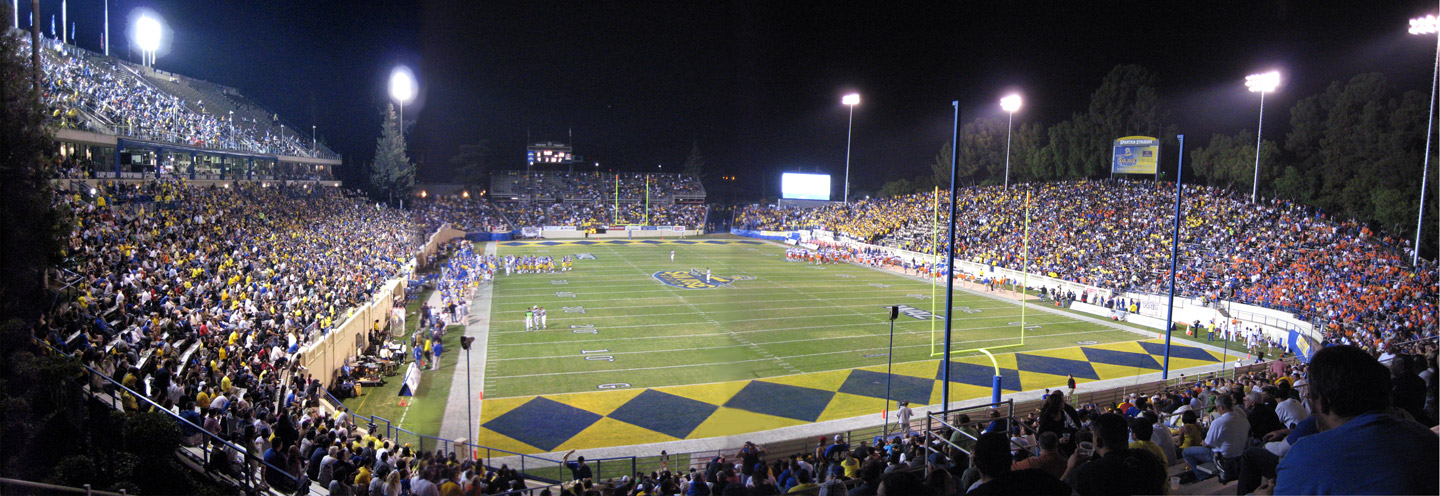
Spartan Stadium – San Jose State vs. Boise State — 2008

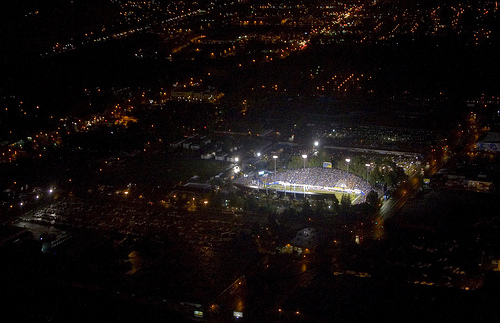
Spartan Stadium – Aerial view at night — 2008

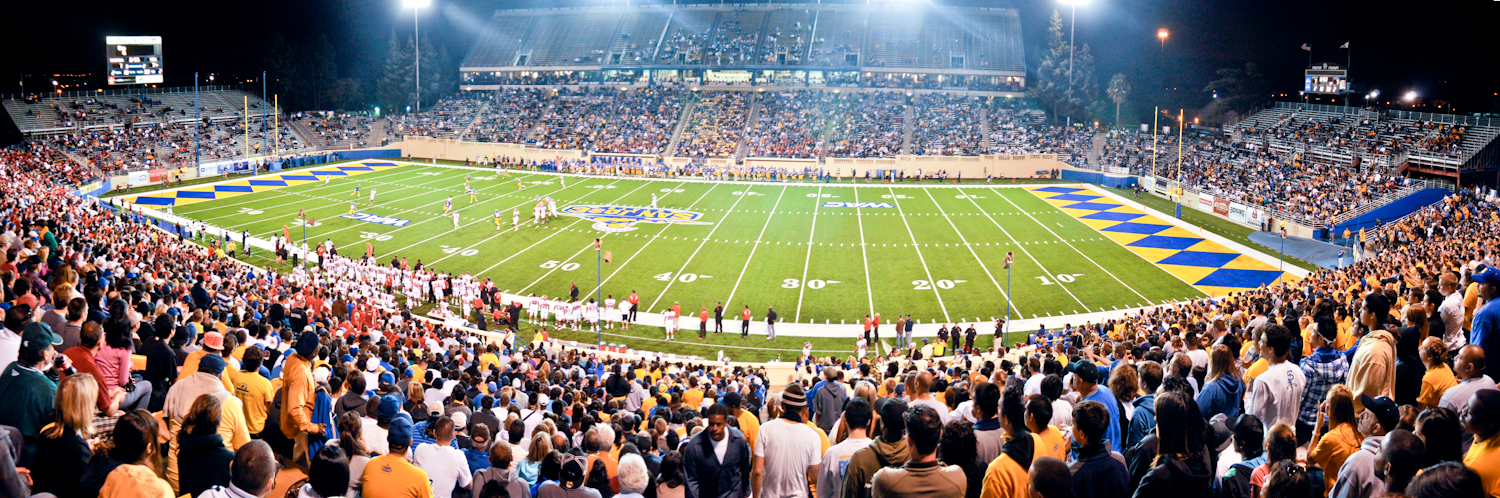
First season using new "FieldTurf" playing surface, San Jose State vs. Utah – 2009

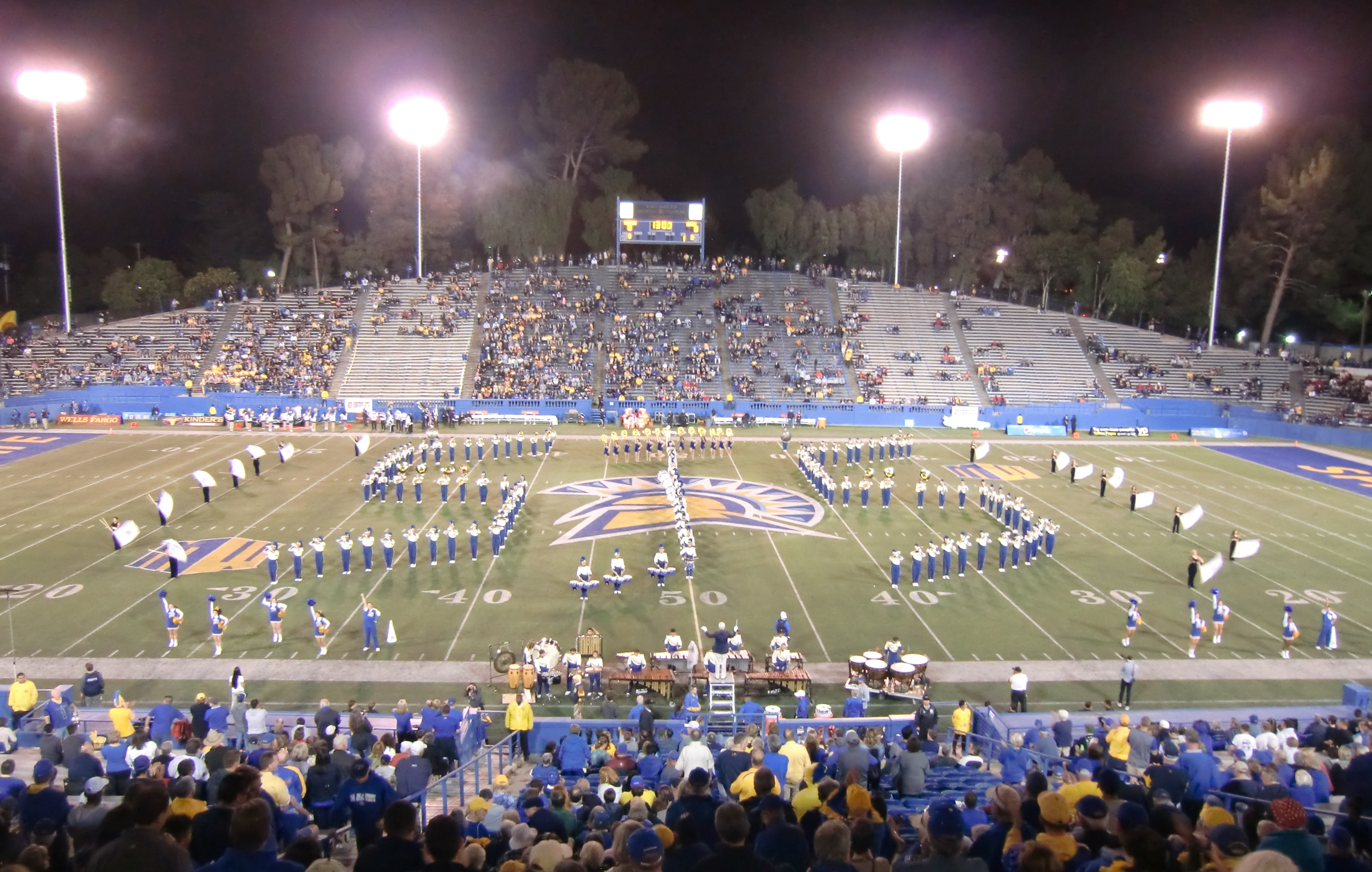
The Spartan Stadium field in 2015

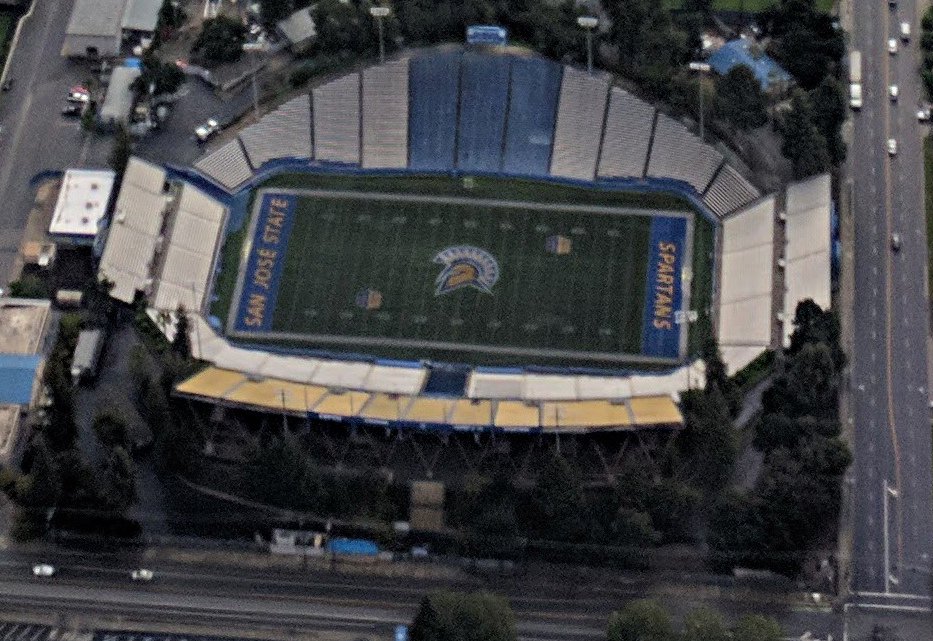
Aerial view from the southwest, 2017

== Nearby venues ==
CEFCU Stadium is only one block from several local professional sports teams and arenas, including:

- The Excite Ballpark, home of the San Jose Giants, the Low-A minor league baseball affiliate of the San Francisco Giants.
- The Tech CU Arena at Sharks Ice San Jose, home of the San Jose Barracuda, the American Hockey League affiliate of the San Jose Sharks.

== See also ==
- List of NCAA Division I FBS football stadiums
- New San Jose State Stadium

Preceded by first stadium	Home of the San Jose Earthquakes; 1996–2005	Succeeded by Buck Shaw Stadium; 2008–2014; Oakland–Alameda County Coliseum (big game venue); 2008–2009
Preceded by Grant Field	Host of the College Cup; 1969	Succeeded by Ralph Korte Stadium
Preceded by UNCG Soccer Stadium	Host of the Women's College Cup; 1999–2000	Succeeded by Gerald J. Ford Stadium
