= The Hockey Book for Girls =

The Hockey Book For Girls
- Canadian hardcover edition
- Author: Stacy Wilson
- Illustrator: Bill Slavin
- Language: English
- Genre: Juvenile literature
- Publisher: Kids Can Press
- Publication date: September 1, 2000
- Publication place: Canada
- Media type: Print (Hardcover)
- Pages: 40 (first edition, hardcover)
- ISBN: 1-55074-719-3 (first edition, hardcover)
- OCLC: 43283421

The Hockey Book For Girls is an introductory book about hockey for females. It was written by former Canadian women's ice hockey player Stacy Wilson. The book was first published by Kids Can Press in September 2000.

== Reception ==
Stacy Wilson of Quill & Quire praised the book, writing, "Practical, proud and passionate, Stacy Wilson’s hockey book for girls is a valuable resource for young girls who play or dream of playing hockey." Booklist reviewer Gillian Engberg stated, "With brief, scattered text and energizing color photos, this is probably best for young girls who are new to the game and want an overview rather than in-depth coverage."

In a negative review, School Library Journal's Barb Lawler said, "the book is poorly written and some of the full-color photographs are small while others are unfocused". Calgary Herald reviewer Mickey Dumont found the book "fills the void by offering a comprehensive look at the world of women's hockey". Edmonton Journal's Vicki Hall praised the "brightly-coloured volume" for having "easy-to-understand language" explaining how girls can become proficient in hockey.

Meredith MacKeen of the Manitoba Library Association's CM: Canadian Review of Materials found that the book "will appeal to young athletes", writing, "The format of the book is attractive with lots of coloured photos and little boxes of information and tips identified as 'try it'."

== See also ==
- The Ultimate Book of Hockey Trivia for Kids
