= The Ultimate Book of Hockey Trivia for Kids =

2015 book by Eric Zweig

- Author: Eric Zweig
- Illustrator: Bill Dickson and Lorna Bennett
- Language: English
- Genre: Juvenile literature
- Publisher: Scholastic Canada
- Publication date: September 1, 2015
- Publication place: Canada
- Media type: Paperback
- Pages: 384
- ISBN: 978-1-4431-4609-8
- OCLC: 905735580

The Ultimate Book of Hockey Trivia for Kids is a book by Eric Zweig published in 2015. Illustrated by Bill Dickson and Lorna Bennett, it is a compilation of three volumes published in previous years: Hockey Trivia for Kids (published in 2006), Hockey Trivia for Kids 2 (published in 2008), and Hockey Trivia for Kids 3 (published in 2011).

The book discusses North American ice hockey trivia starting from the beginning to the current day. It shares facts about National Hockey League teams and players, the Stanley Cup, and hockey games.

== Reception ==
Dave Jenkinson, a Professor Emeritus of the Faculty of Education at the University of Manitoba, wrote in the Manitoba Library Association's Canadian Review of Materials that The Ultimate Book of Hockey Trivia for Kids is "a terrific purchase by hockey aficionados, whether child or adult". In its Best Books for Kids & Teens guide, Canadian Children's Book Centre said, "This giant collection of hockey trivia is full of all the fun and fascinating facts every ultimate hockey fan needs to know!"

Victoria Pennell wrote in the Society for Canadian Educational Resources' Resource Links that "[t]his book is sure to be a hit with all hockey fans, not just kids". Pennell further wrote, "There is no table of contents or index in this book, thus making it a little difficult if looking for specific information, however, most readers will enjoy it for the trivia aspect rather than as a reference tool".

== See also ==
- The Hockey Book for Girls
