= New San Jose State Stadium =

Planned multi-use stadium

New San Jose State Stadium was a planned a multi-use stadium in San Jose, California. Once scheduled for completion in 2009, it would have been used mostly for soccer and football matches. The stadium was to have been shared by the San Jose State University Spartans football team and a revived San Jose Earthquakes Major League Soccer franchise. The University and real estate developer Lew Wolff, who owns the rights to the Earthquakes, discontinued negotiations over the proposed stadium in April 2007, over revenue sharing and land use issues.

The stadium would have had a capacity of 30,000 people for football and 23,000 for soccer. It would have been built next to, and replaced, the existing CEFCU Stadium, on the SJSU South Campus. The location is currently used as practice fields, stadium parking, and for sporting events that do not attract a crowd large enough to justify using the stadium.
