= Ryan Sittler =

Canadian-born American ice hockey player

- Born: January 28, 1974 (age 52) London, Ontario, Canada
- Height: 6 ft 2 in (188 cm)
- Weight: 195 lb (88 kg; 13 st 13 lb)
- Position: Left wing
- Shot: Left
- Played for: AHL; Hershey Bears; St. John's Maple Leafs; Baltimore Bandits; ECHL; Johnstown Chiefs; Raleigh IceCaps; Mobile Mysticks; South Carolina Stingrays; Charlotte Checkers
- NHL draft: 7th overall, 1992; Philadelphia Flyers
- Playing career: 1994–1999

Ryan Sittler (born January 28, 1974) is a Canadian-American former professional ice hockey left winger who played in the American Hockey League (AHL). He is the son of Hockey Hall of Famer Darryl Sittler and brother of former Team USA player Meaghan Sittler. Sittler was born in London, Ontario, but grew up in Buffalo, New York.

== Playing career ==
Sittler was drafted by the Philadelphia Flyers in the first round (7th overall) of the 1992 NHL entry draft. With the selection of Ryan he and his father became the first father and son selected in the top ten in the draft's history, Darryl having been selected 8th overall in 1970 by the Toronto Maple Leafs. Ryan played college hockey for the Michigan Wolverines and played on a line with Brendan Morrison during his sophomore season. He left Michigan after his sophomore season and turned pro. A series of major injuries prevented him from ever playing in the National Hockey League and eventually cut his career short at age 25.

== Career statistics ==
=== Regular season and playoffs ===
			Regular season					Playoffs
Season	Team	League	GP	G	A	Pts	PIM	GP	G	A	Pts	PIM
1991–92	Nichols School	HS-NY	22	19	29	48	38	—	—	—	—	—
1992–93	University of Michigan	CCHA	35	9	24	33	43	—	—	—	—	—
1993–94	University of Michigan	CCHA	26	9	9	18	14	—	—	—	—	—
1994–95	Hershey Bears	AHL	42	2	7	9	48	—	—	—	—	—
1994–95	Johnstown Chiefs	ECHL	1	1	1	2	0	—	—	—	—	—
1995–96	Hershey Bears	AHL	7	0	1	1	6	—	—	—	—	—
1995–96	Mobile Mysticks	ECHL	21	3	11	14	30	—	—	—	—	—
1995–96	Raleigh IceCaps	ECHL	12	2	8	10	8	—	—	—	—	—
1995–96	St. John's Maple Leafs	AHL	6	1	2	3	18	4	0	0	0	4
1996–97	Baltimore Bandits	AHL	66	4	22	26	167	3	1	0	1	0
1997–98	South Carolina Stingrays	ECHL	44	12	15	27	66	4	0	0	0	8
1998–99	Charlotte Checkers	ECHL	33	3	9	12	112	—	—	—	—	—
AHL totals			121	7	32	39	239	7	1	0	1	4
ECHL totals			111	21	44	65	216	4	0	0	0	8

=== International ===
Year	Team	Event	GP	G	A	Pts	PIM
1992	United States	WJC	7	0	1	1	2
1993	United States	WJC	7	3	2	5	6
1994	United States	WJC	1	0	0	0	2
Junior totals			15	3	3	6	10

Preceded by Peter Forsberg	Philadelphia Flyers' first-round draft pick 1992	Succeeded by Jason Bowen
