= Guo Wei (businessman, born 1975) =

Chinese businessman

Wei Guo (William Kwo) 郭巍
- Born: 15 April 1975 (age 51); Baotou, Inner Mongolia, China
- Other name: William Kwo
- Education: Renmin University of China
- Occupation: Vice President of Kaixin001.com

Wei Guo (also known as William Kwo, Chinese:郭巍; born 15 April 1975) is a Chinese senior executive of Internet and Media. He is the Vice President of Kaixin001.com.

== Early life ==
Guo studied Mass Communication at Renmin University of China from 1992. In his second year at the university, he was elected president of the college's student union. In his third year, Guo was selected as an intern news reporter by China Central Television.

Guo graduated with a BA honours degree in 1996.

== Career ==
In 1996, Guo began his career as a journalist for the Xinhua News Agency. In 2004, he took in charge of the foundation and business development of new media in Xinhua News Agency, and by 2005 he had become an executive vice director. In 2005, he announced the launch of Xinhua Video, a 24-hour mobile TV station.

In 2008, Guo became a consultant for Kaixin001.com. In 2010, he joined kaixin001.com as the Vice President of Branding, Marketing, Business Development, GR and HR. With his help, 'Tou Cai (Steal vegetables) became the most popular app on Kaixin001.com.

Kaixin001.com became one of the most influential social networks in China. This has also caused a big change to the meaning of “tou cai”, making the word to become well known to the majority of China.

Guo is also responsible for the “True or False Kaxin001.com” lawsuit between Renren and Kaixin001.com. The case lasted for two years and went to the Supreme People's Court of China, before being ultimately won by kaixin001.com.

Since 2012, Guo has focused on promotion in Kaxin001.com'smobile games business, making the company's management structure more flexible to fit the needs of net citizen in the mobile internet era.
