= Stephanie O'Sullivan (ice hockey) =

American ice hockey player (born 1971)

Stephanie O'Sullivan (born July 30, 1971) is a former American hockey player for the United States women's national ice hockey team between 1994 and 2000. While playing hockey for Providence College during the 1990s, O'Sullivan and her team were first at the 1993 ECAC tournament. Her 126 goals were in the top ten for ECAC Hockey during 2023. She continued to hold the Providence record of 127 assists during 2024. O'Sullivan was the 1992 Rookie of the Year and 1995 Player of the Year for ECAC.

O'Sullivan played at the 1993 U.S. Olympic Festival. With the national team, O'Sullivan won four silvers at the IIHF Women's World Championship. Her accumulated twenty assists are in the top twenty for the United States. Outside of hockey, O'Sullivan joined the Suffolk County District Attorney's Office by the late 2000s before being hired by the Boston Police Department during 2010. She joined the Massachusetts Hockey Hall of Fame during 2008.

== Early life and education ==
On July 30, 1971, O'Sullivan was born in Dorchester, Massachusetts. She played boys hockey at Dorchester Youth Hockey and Matignon High School. She was also on the high school softball team. O'Sullivan played softball while briefly attending University of Massachusetts Lowell during the early 1990s. Between 1991 and 1995, she was on the hockey team at Providence College.

At the ECAC tournament, O'Sullivan and her team were first during 1993. In 2024, O'Sullivan continued to hold the Providence record of 127 assists. She was also in second place with 126 goals and 253 points. Her goals were in the top ten for ECAC Hockey during 2023.

== Career ==
=== Sports ===
O'Sullivan was a hockey player at the 1993 U.S. Olympic Festival with the Americans. She won four silver medals at the IIHF Women's World Championship between 1994 and 2000 as a member of the United States women's national ice hockey team. As part of her 32 points during the event, she had 12 goals and 20 assists. Her assists are in the top twenty for the American team. During this time period, O'Sullivan was a silver medalist at the IIHF Women's Pacific Rim Championship in 1995 and 1996.

At the 3 Nations Cup, her team was second during 1996 and won the 1997 edition. She was released in 1997 after not being selected for the 1998 Winter Olympics. O'Sullivan was on the Bay State Breakers as an exhibition player during the late 1990s before returning to the American team in 1999. That year, her team was second at the 3 Nations Cup. She was not chosen for the 2002 Winter Olympics. Outside of competitions, she had joined the O'Sullivan Hockey Academy as a co-owner by 1998. By 1999, O'Sullivan expanded her career with the Boston Police Athletic League. When they became the Boston Police Activities League during 2019, O'Sullivan remained with them.

=== Law ===
O'Sullivan joined the Suffolk County District Attorney's Office by 2007. During her investigator experience, O'Sullivan wanted to join the Boston Police Department that year after they "raised the upper age limit for recruits from 32 to 40." Following her 2010 hiring, she became a police officer. She remained with the police leading up to the early 2020s.

== Honors and personal life ==
As a member of the ECAC, O'Sullivan was the 1992 Rookie of the Year and 1995 Player of the Year. She was an All-Star in 1993 and 1994. O'Sullivan received an additional All-Star selection in 1995. From the New England Hockey Writers, she was an All-Star in 1994 and 1995.

She joined the Massachusetts Hockey Hall of Fame in 2008 and the Providence College Athletics Hall of Fame in 2009. O'Sullivan lived with ten siblings after the death of her parents during the early 1990s. She is related to NHL player Chris O'Sullivan.
