= Colby Mules women's ice hockey =

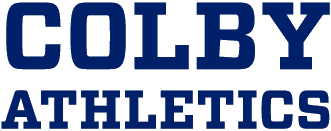
- University: Colby College
- Conference: NESCAC
- Head coach: Holley Tyng
- Arena: Waterville, Maine
- Colors: Colby blue and Priscilla gray

The Colby Mules Women's Ice Hockey program represents Colby College. The program started in 1975 and is one of the oldest women's hockey programs in the nation. The team was a founding member of the ECAC Division I League, and currently is a member of the New England Small College Athletic Conference (NESCAC), one of the top competitive Division III conferences in the nation.

Colby Women's Ice Hockey is currently coached by Coach Holley Tyng, the 2020 NESCAC Coach of the year, who joined the program in 2016.

== Players ==
- The Mules have had six All-American awards, including two-time All-American, 2024 NESCAC Player of the Year, and 2022 NESCAC Rookie of the Year, Meg Rittenhouse '24.

== Coaches ==
- Laura Halldorson led the Mules to a 12-9-1 overall record in 1995–96. In the process, she earned ECAC Co-Coach of the Year honors as well as being named the New England Hockey Writers’ Coach of the Year. While at Colby, she recruited and coached U.S. National Team members Meaghan Sittler and Barb Gordon. Following two seasons as an assistant at Princeton, she took over at Colby, where she spent seven seasons building a program that turned a 5-12-2 record in her first season into a 12-9-1 mark in her last season.
- Holley Tyng joined the Mules in 2016 and was named the 2020 NESCAC Coach of the Year. She reached her 100th career victory in January 2025 in a 4-1 win over Trinity College and has a career record of 100-74-18. In her first season as coach, Coach Tyng brought the team from two wins in 2016-17 to 15 wins in 2019-20. The team had its most wins in program history in 2022-23.

== Postseason ==
=== ECAC Tournament ===
- 1988
  - FIRST ROUND, New Hampshire 4, Colby 0
- 1996
  - QUARTERFINALS AT HIGHER SEEDS, No. 1 Brown 7, No. 8 Colby 2
- 1997
  - QUARTERFINALS, No. 1 Brown 6, No. 8 Colby 2

=== NCAA Tournament ===
- 2021-22
  - SECOND ROUND
- 2022-23
  - SECOND ROUND

== Awards and honors ==
- Laura Halldorson, ECAC Co-Coach of the Year honors
- Laura Halldorson, New England Hockey Writers’ Coach of the Year.
- Courtney Kennedy, 1998 American Women's College Hockey Alliance All-Americans
- Meaghan Sittler, 1998 American Women's College Hockey Alliance All-Americans
- Meaghan Sittler, 1998 Top 10 Finalist, Patty Kazmaier Award
