= Melanie Haz =

Canadian soccer player

Personal information
- Date of birth: 26 November 1975 (age 50)
- Place of birth: Edmonton, Alberta, Canada
- Height: 1.73 m (5 ft 8 in)
- Position: Goalkeeper

International career
Years	Team	Apps	(Gls)
- Canada

Melanie Haz (born 26 November 1975) is a Canadian professional soccer player who played as a goalkeeper for the Canada women's national soccer team. She was part of the team at the 1999 FIFA Women's World Cup.
