= Guo Wei (ice hockey) =

Chinese ice hockey player

- Born: 7 November 1969 (age 56) China
- Height: 169 cm (5 ft 7 in)
- Weight: 67 kg (148 lb; 10 st 8 lb)
- Position: Forward
- Played for: Harbin Ice Hockey
- National team: China

Guo Wei
- Traditional Chinese: 國偉
- Simplified Chinese: 国伟
Transcriptions
Standard Mandarin
- Hanyu Pinyin: Guó Wěi

Guo Wei (Chinese: 国伟; born 7 November 1969) is a Chinese retired ice hockey player and former member of the Chinese national team. She represented China in the women's ice hockey tournament at the 1998 Winter Olympics in Nagano and at the 1997 IIHF Women's World Championship.

== Career statistics ==
Note: GP = Games played; G = Goals; A = Assists; Pts = Points; PIM = Penalty minutes;

				Regular season
Year	Team	Event	Result	GP	G	A	Pts	PIM
1997	China	WC	4th	5	3	3	6	2
1998	China	OG	4th	6	3	1	4	6
