= Sharks Ice San Jose =

Indoor ice rink in San Jose, California

- Official, current logo since 2022

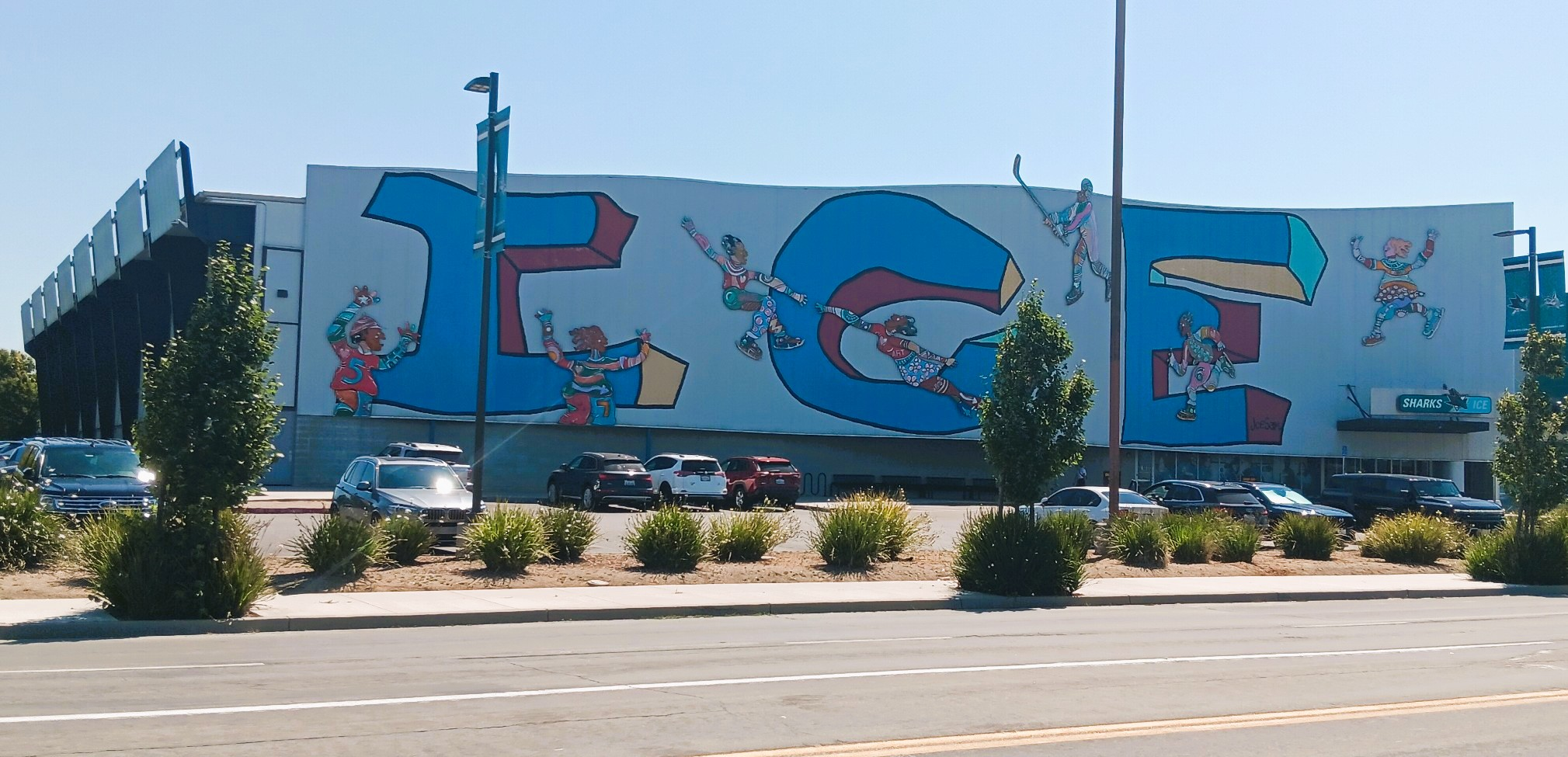
- Sharks Ice at San Jose in 2025
- Interactive map of Sharks Ice San Jose
- Former names: Ice Center of San Jose (1994–2001); Logitech Ice At San Jose (2001–2007); Sharks Ice San Jose (2007–2016, 2022–present); Solar4America Ice (2016–2022)
- Location: 1500 South Tenth Street, San Jose, California, 95112
- Coordinates: 37.31966°N 121.86422°W
- Owner: City of San Jose
- Operator: Sharks Sports & Entertainment

Construction
- Opened: 1994
- Renovated: 2020 (Tech CU Arena)

Tenants
- San Jose Sharks (NHL); San Jose State Spartans (ACHA); San Jose Jr. Sharks (NCYH); Sharks High School Hockey League (SHSHL)

Website
- https://www.sharksiceatsanjose.com/

Sharks Ice at San Jose (formerly the Ice Center of San Jose, Logitech Ice Center, and Solar4AmericaIce) is an indoor ice rink in San Jose, California, United States. The largest ice rink facility in the Western United States, Sharks Ice serves as the official training facility for the NHL San Jose Sharks and the home arena for San Jose State University's Spartans club hockey team. The venue is also used for public skating, public/private skating programs, ice hockey programs, and other winter sports (i.e. broomball, curling, speed skating, ice dancing, figure skating, etc.).

== History ==
=== 1990s ===
The facility opened in 1994 as Ice Center of San Jose and was expanded in 2000 and 2005. In 1995, the City of San Jose held a couple of community meetings to place "public art work for the 'wave wall'" on the building's facade. By January 1996, the city picked San Francisco-resident Joseph Samuel (aka JoeSam) to design the facade, and has been there ever since.

In 1995, the arena hosted the Women's Pacific Rim Championship ice hockey tournament.

=== 2000s ===
In 2001, Swiss consumer electronics company Logitech bought the naming rights to the rink, therefore, renaming it into Logitech Ice At San Jose until September 2007 when the name changed into, what is today, Sharks Ice at San Jose.

Remodeled in the summer of 2005, the 180,000 ft^{2} (17,000 m^{2}) facility features five NHL-sized ice rinks (the Spartans play on the North Rink, which has a listed seating capacity of approximately 550, but is routinely packed with upwards of 1000 fans on game nights), as well as a full-service Pro Shop, a full-service Food Court, and meeting space for up to 500 guests.

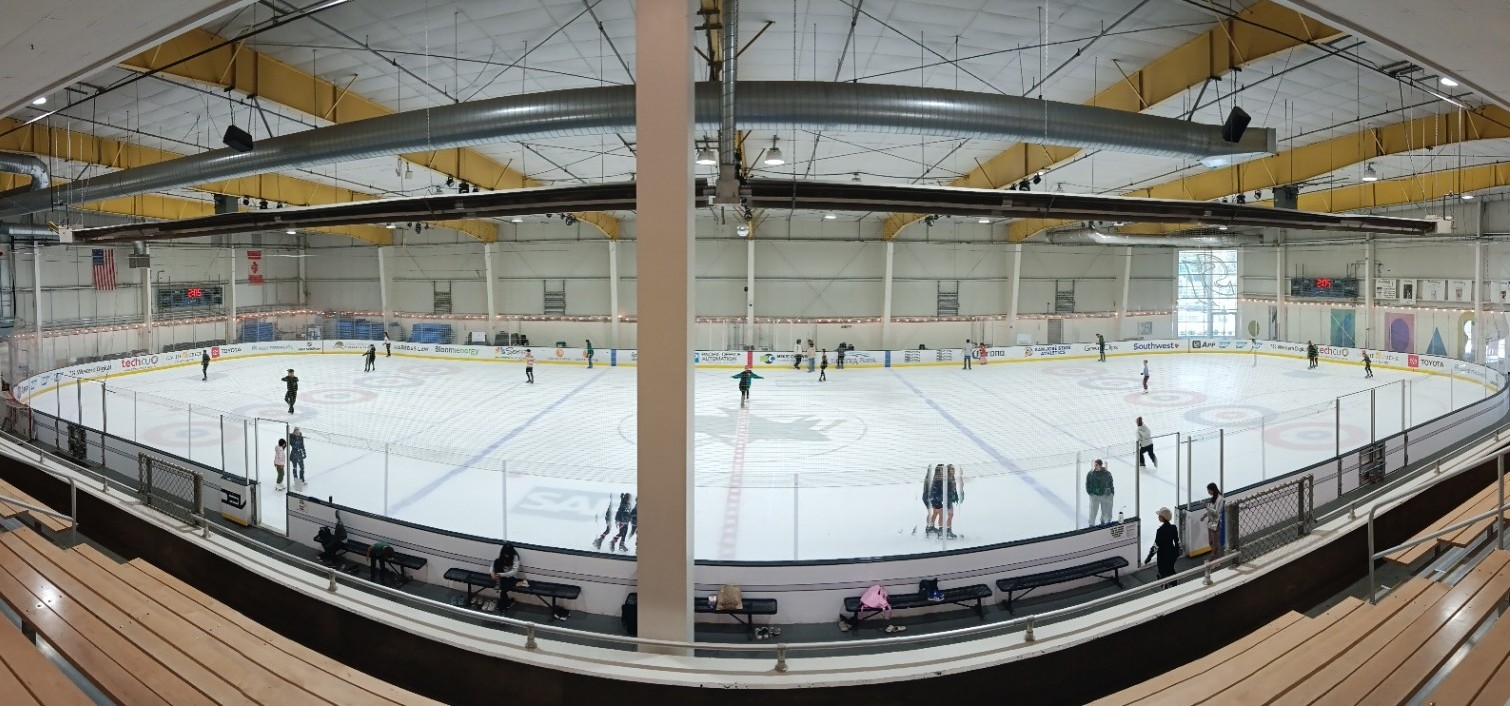
White Rink

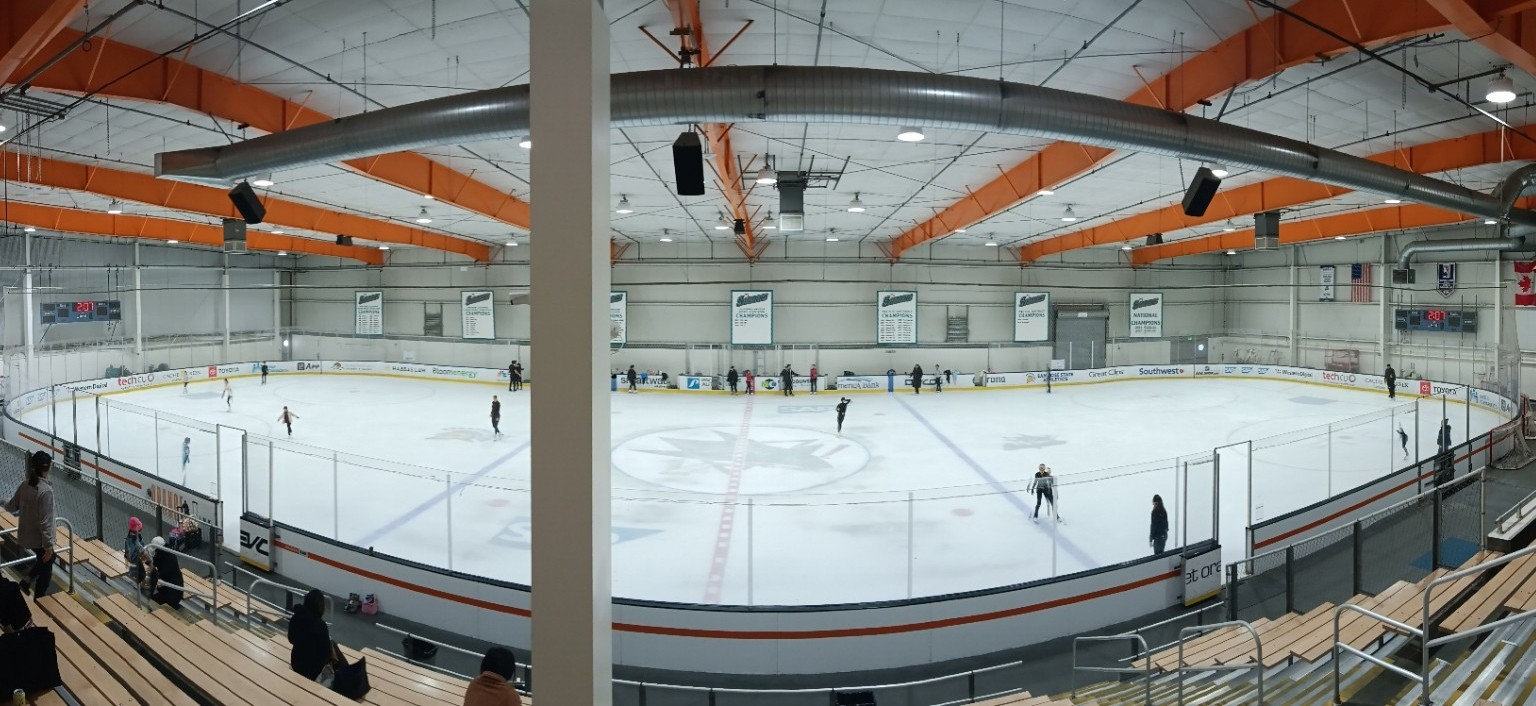
Orange Rink

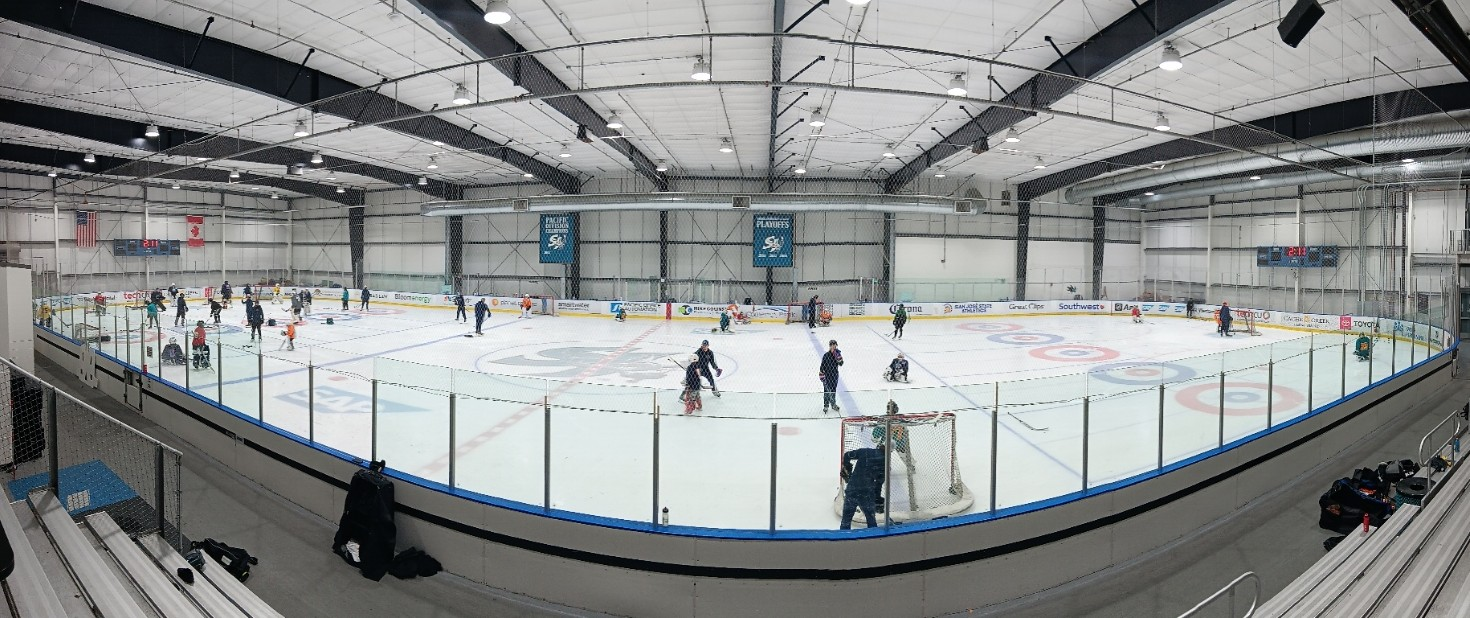
Black Rink

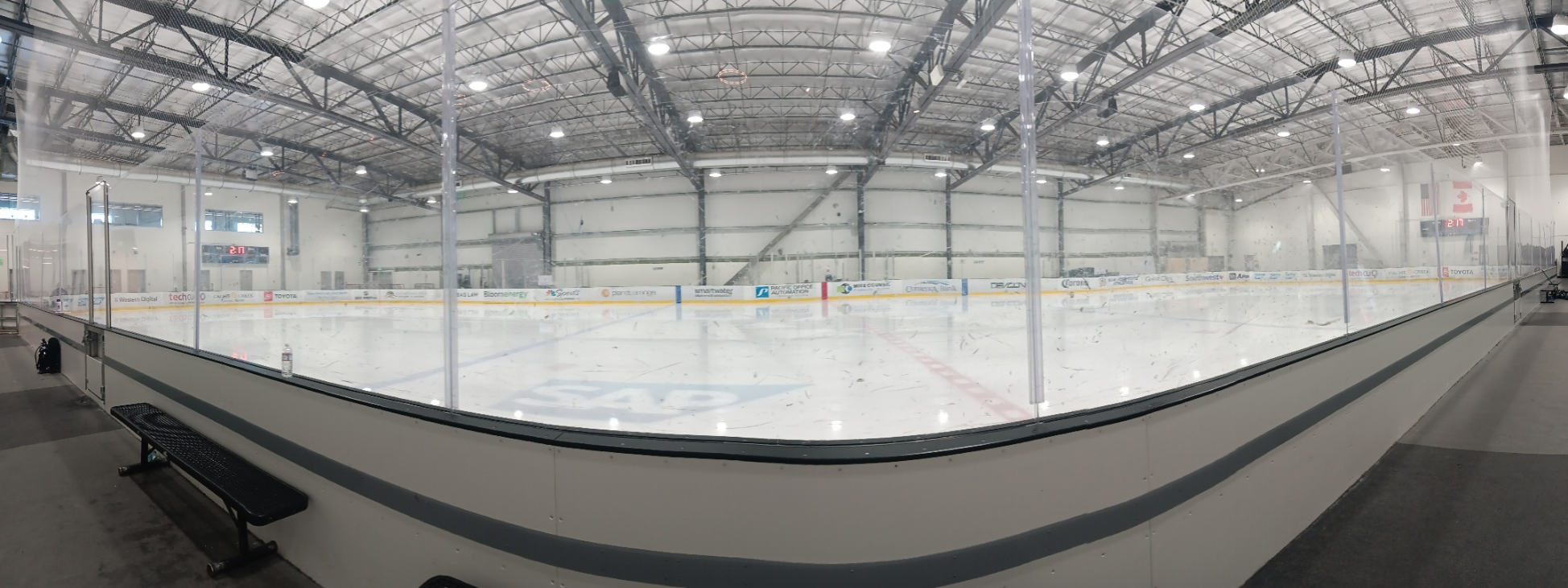
Gray Rink

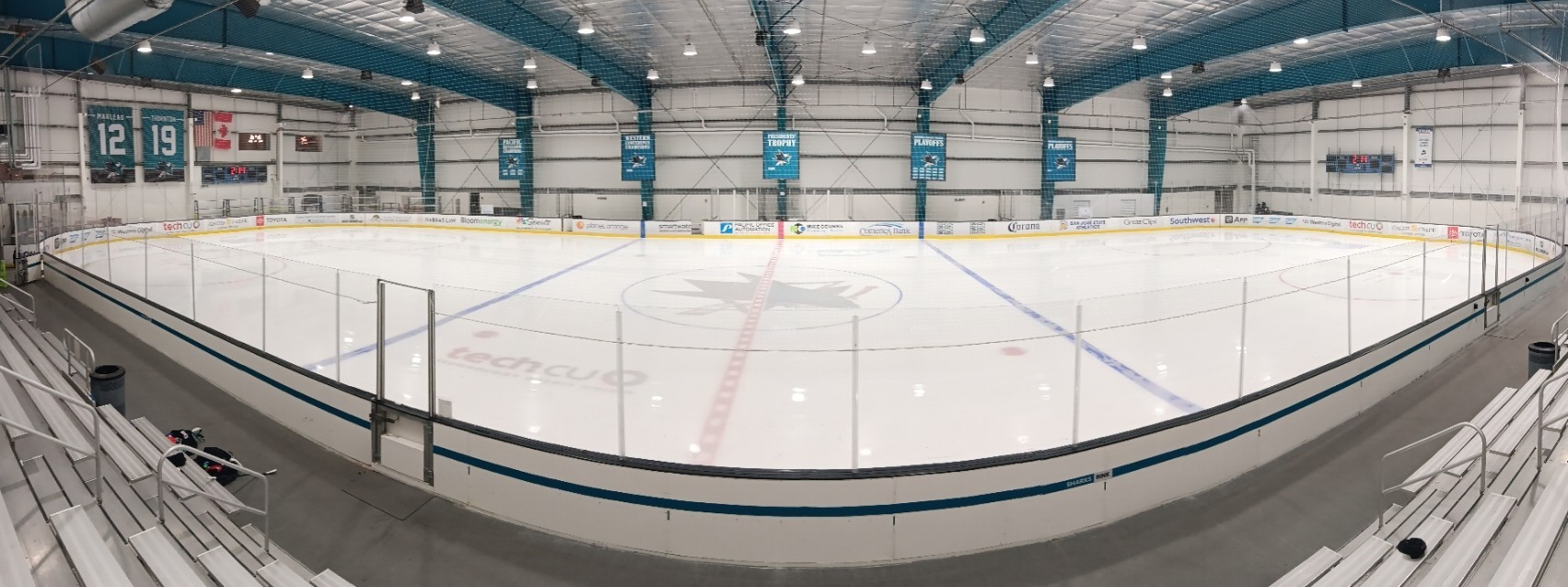
Sharks Rink

Additionally, Stanley's Sports Bar & Grill, opened in January 2006, features food, beer, and wine.

=== 2010s and beyond ===
Roofing contractor PetersenDean bought naming rights to the facility in 2016, renaming the facility after its Solar4America solar roofing brand. After PetersenDean's bankruptcy in 2020, the name reverted to Sharks Ice San Jose for the second time.

A proposed 200,800 ft^{2} (18,650 m^{2}) expansion would add another two rink surfaces and more than double the size of the facility, but would displace the San Jose Municipal Firing Range. If the expansion is approved, it would begin construction in 2020 and finish in December 2021. The facility expansion included the new Tech CU Arena, the permanent home of the San Jose Barracuda.
