= 1995 Women's Pacific Rim Championship =

1995 IIHF Women's Pacific Rim Championship
Tournament details
- Host country: United States
- Venue(s): Ice Center at San Jose, San Jose (in 1 host city)
- Dates: April 3 - April 8
- Teams: 4

Final positions
- Champions: Canada (1st title)
- Runners-up: United States
- Third place: China

Tournament statistics
- Games played: 10
- Goals scored: 77 (7.7 per game)

The 1995 IIHF Women's Pacific Rim Championship was an international ice hockey tournament held between April 3 and 8, 1995 in San Jose, California, United States.

Canada won the tournament despite losing in the group stage 5-2 to the United States. They defeated China in a shootout before taking the US to a shootout as well to win the championship.

== Teams and format ==
Four teams completed in this inaugural tournament. The teams were:

- Canada
- China
- Japan
- United States

The teams first played a full round robin against each other. After these three games, all teams proceeded to the semi-final (1st vs 4th and 2nd vs 3rd) with the winning teams meeting in the final.

== First round ==
=== Standings ===
Pos	Team	Pld	W	D	L	GF	GA	GD	Pts
1	United States	3	3	0	0	22	4	+18	6
2	Canada	3	2	0	1	23	6	+17	4
3	China	3	1	0	2	6	13	−7	2
4	Japan	3	0	0	3	1	29	−28	0

=== Results ===
April 3, 1995; 5:30 pm	Canada	12 – 0	Japan	San Jose

April 3, 1995; 8:30 pm	United States	3 – 2	China	San Jose

April 4, 1995; 5:30 pm	Canada	9 – 1	China	San Jose

April 4, 1995; 8:30 pm	United States	14 – 0	Japan	San Jose

April 6, 1995; 5:30 pm	China	3 – 1	Japan	San Jose

April 6, 1995; 8:30 pm	United States	5 – 2	Canada	San Jose

== Playoff round ==
=== Final round ===
Semi-Final			Final
1	United States	12
4	Japan	0	1	United States	1
3	China	2	2	Canada APS	2
2	Canada APS	3

=== Semi-finals ===
April 7, 1995; 5:30 pm	United States	12 – 0	Japan	San Jose

April 7, 1995; 8:30	Canada	3 – 2 APS	China	San Jose

=== Match for third place ===
April 8, 1995; 5:30 pm	China	5 – 0	Japan	San Jose

=== Final ===
April 8, 1995; 8:30 pm	Canada	2 – 1 APS	United States	San Jose

== Champions ==
1995 IIHF Women's Pacific Rim Championship

Canada
1st title

== Final standings ==
Rk.	Team
1st place, gold medalist(s)	Canada
2nd place, silver medalist(s)	United States
3rd place, bronze medalist(s)	China
4.	Japan

== See also ==
- 1996 Women's Pacific Rim Championship
