= IIHF Women's Pacific Rim Championship =

The IIHF Women's Pacific Rim Championships were IIHF-sanctioned international ice hockey tournaments held in 1995 and 1996, with teams from Canada, United States, China and Japan. In 1996, the tournament served as a qualifying tournament for the World Championship.

After 1996, the tournament was discontinued as the IIHF World Women Championships were expanded.

== Background ==
In 1987, the Canadian Amateur Hockey Association (CAHA) requested that the International Ice Hockey Federation (IIHF) sanction an annual international women's tournament. Even as the first was held in 1990, talks began for a Pacific Rim Championship that could include Canada, the US, Japan, North Korea, South Korea, China, and possibly Australia and New Zealand. It was envisioned as a counterpart to the IIHF European Women Championships, held every two years (i.e.: in alternate years with the world championship).

== Events ==
The 1995 event was held 3–8 April in San Jose, California, at Logitech Ice Center. The 1996 event was held in the Vancouver, British Columbia, suburb of Richmond at Minoru Arena, 1–3 April.

Rank	1995	1996
1st place, gold medalist(s)	Canada	Canada
2nd place, silver medalist(s)	United States	United States
3rd place, bronze medalist(s)	China	China
4.	Japan	Japan

== Participants ==
- Canada national women's ice hockey team
- China women's national ice hockey team
- Japan women's national ice hockey team
- United States women's national ice hockey team
