= 1996 Women's Pacific Rim Championship =

1996 IIHF Women's Pacific Rim Championship
Tournament details
- Host country: Canada
- Venue(s): Minoru Arena, Richmond, British Columbia (in 1 host city)
- Dates: April 1–6, 1996
- Teams: 4

Final positions
- Champions: Canada (2nd title)
- Runners-up: United States
- Third place: China

Tournament statistics
- Games played: 10
- Goals scored: 78 (7.8 per game)

The 1996 IIHF Women's Pacific Rim Championship was an international ice hockey tournament held between April 1 and 6, 1996, in Richmond, British Columbia, Canada.

Canada won their second title in this event completing a 100% record in this competition as it was the last year that it was held. The Canadians won all of their games defeating the United States 4-1 in the final.

== Teams and format ==
Four teams completed in this tournament. The teams were:

- Canada
- China
- Japan
- United States

The teams first played a full round robin against each other. After these three games, all teams proceeded to the semi-final (1st vs 4th and 2nd vs 3rd) with the winning teams meeting in the final.

== First round ==
=== Standings ===
Pos	Team	Pld	W	D	L	GF	GA	GD	Pts
1	Canada	3	3	0	0	16	2	+14	6
2	United States	3	2	0	1	21	5	+16	4
3	China	3	1	0	2	6	6	0	2
4	Japan	3	0	0	3	1	31	−30	0

=== Results ===
April 1, 1996; 5:00 pm	United States	4–2	China	Richmond

April 1, 1996; 9:00 pm	Canada	12–0	Japan	Richmond

April 2, 1996; 5:00 pm	Canada	1–0	China	Richmond

April 2, 1996; 9:00 pm	Japan	0–15	United States	Richmond

April 3, 1996; 5:00 pm	China	4–1	Japan	Richmond

April 3, 1996; 9:00 pm	Canada	3–2	United States	Richmond

== Play-off round ==
=== Final round ===
Semi-Final			Final
1	Canada	18
4	Japan	0	1	Canada	4
2	United States	5	2	United States	1
3	China	0

=== Semi-finals ===
April 5, 1996; 5:00 pm	Canada	18–0	Japan	Richmond

April 5, 1996; 9:00 pm	United States	5–0	China	Richmond

=== Match for third place ===
April 6, 1996; 5:30 pm	China	5–1	Japan	Richmond

=== Final ===
April 6, 1996; 8:30 pm	Canada	4–1	United States	Richmond

== Champions ==
1996 IIHF Women's Pacific Rim Championship

Canada
2nd title

== Final standings ==
Rk.	Team
1st place, gold medalist(s)	Canada
2nd place, silver medalist(s)	United States
3rd place, bronze medalist(s)	China
4.	Japan

== See also ==
- 1995 Women's Pacific Rim Championship
