= Sweden at the 1998 Winter Olympics =

- IOC code: SWE
- NOC: Swedish Olympic Committee
- Website: www.sok.se (in Swedish and English)

in Nagano
- Competitors: 99 (53 men, 46 women) in 10 sports
- Flag bearer: Torgny Mogren (cross-country skiing)
- Medals Ranked 17th: Gold 0 Silver 2 Bronze 1 Total 3

Winter Olympics appearances (overview)
- 1924; 1928; 1932; 1936; 1948; 1952; 1956; 1960; 1964; 1968; 1972; 1976; 1980; 1984; 1988; 1992; 1994; 1998; 2002; 2006; 2010; 2014; 2018; 2022; 2026

Sweden competed at the 1998 Winter Olympics in Nagano, Japan.

== Competitors ==
The following is the list of number of competitors in the Games.

Sport	Men	Women	Total
Alpine skiing	3	4	7
Biathlon	4	4	8
Cross-country skiing	6	5	11
Curling	5	5	10
Figure skating	0	1	1
Freestyle skiing	4	4	8
Ice hockey	21	20	41
Luge	3	0	3
Short track speed skating	1	0	1
Snowboarding	6	4	10
Total	53	46	99

== Medalists ==
Medal	Name	Sport	Event	Date
Silver	Pernilla Wiberg	Alpine skiing	Women's downhill	February 16
Silver	Niklas Jonsson	Cross country skiing	Men's 50km freestyle	February 22
Bronze	Women's curling team: Elisabet Gustafson; Margaretha Lindahl; Louise Marmont; Katarina Nyberg; Elisabeth Persson	Curling	Women's competition	February 15

== Alpine skiing ==
Men

Athlete	Event	Race 1	Race 2	Total	
Athlete	Event	Time	Time	Time	Rank
Patrik Järbyn	Downhill			1:51.22	10
Fredrik Nyberg	Super-G			1:36.31	10
Patrik Järbyn	Super-G			1:35.72	6
Martin Hansson	Giant slalom	DNF	–	DNF	–
Patrik Järbyn	Giant slalom	1:23.19	1:20.63	2:43.82	21
Fredrik Nyberg	Giant slalom	1:22.32	1:18.63	2:40.95	10
Martin Hansson	Slalom	DNF	–	DNF	–

Men's combined

Athlete	Slalom		Downhill	Total	
Athlete	Time 1	Time 2	Time	Total time	Rank
Patrik Järbyn	DNF	–	–	DNF	–

Women

Athlete	Event	Race 1	Race 2	Total	
Athlete	Event	Time	Time	Time	Rank
Pernilla Wiberg	Downhill			1:29.18	2nd place, silver medalist(s)
Pernilla Wiberg	Super-G			1:18.88	14
Ylva Nowén	Giant slalom	DNF	–	DNF	–
Martina Fortkord	Giant slalom	1:21.99	1:34.36	2:56.35	14
Pernilla Wiberg	Giant slalom	1:21.48	1:33.92	2:55.40	11
Anna Ottosson	Giant slalom	1:20.48	1:33.33	2:53.81	7
Pernilla Wiberg	Slalom	DNF	–	DNF	–
Martina Fortkord	Slalom	53.25	DNF	DNF	–
Ylva Nowén	Slalom	48.07	48.26	1:36.33	12
Anna Ottosson	Slalom	47.31	47.93	1:35.24	10

Women's combined

Athlete	Downhill	Slalom		Total	
Athlete	Time	Time 1	Time 2	Total time	Rank
Pernilla Wiberg	1:28.86	DNF	–	DNF	–

== Biathlon ==
Men

Event	Athlete	Misses ^{1}	Time	Rank
10 km Sprint	Mikael Löfgren	1	29:31.6	25
10 km Sprint	Fredrik Kuoppa	2	29:22.0	21

Event	Athlete	Time	Misses	Adjusted time ^{2}	Rank
20 km	Fredrik Kuoppa	59:59.2	2	1'01:59.2	39
20 km	Mikael Löfgren	58:00.3	2	1'00:00.3	20

Men's 4 × 7.5 km relay

Athletes	Race		
Athletes	Misses ^{1}	Time	Rank
Mikael Löfgren; Jonas Eriksson; Tord Wiksten; Fredrik Kuoppa	0	1'25:25.7	10

Women

Event	Athlete	Misses ^{1}	Time	Rank
7.5 km Sprint	Maria Schylander	4	27:46.9	60
7.5 km Sprint	Eva-Karin Westin	1	26:07.8	51
7.5 km Sprint	Kristina Brounéus	2	26:05.3	50
7.5 km Sprint	Magdalena Forsberg	3	24:19.5	17

Event	Athlete	Time	Misses	Adjusted time ^{2}	Rank
15 km	Kristina Brounéus	1'04:51.1	5	1'09:51.1	64
15 km	Eva-Karin Westin	1'01:00.5	2	1'03:00.5	52
15 km	Maria Schylander	58:35.0	4	1'02:35.0	49
15 km	Magdalena Forsberg	54:16.9	3	57:16.9	14

Women's 4 × 7.5 km relay

Athletes	Race		
Athletes	Misses ^{1}	Time	Rank
Maria Schylander; Magdalena Forsberg; Kristina Brounéus; Eva-Karin Westin	0	1'44:50.8	10

^{1} A penalty loop of 150 metres had to be skied per missed target.
^{2} One minute added per missed target.

== Cross-country skiing ==
Men

Event	Athlete	Race	
Event	Athlete	Time	Rank
10 km C	Henrik Forsberg	30:55.7	56
10 km C	Niklas Jonsson	29:04.9	25
15 km pursuit^{1} F	Henrik Forsberg	44:04.9	31
15 km pursuit^{1} F	Niklas Jonsson	41:01.7	10
30 km C	Henrik Forsberg	1'40:44.1	25
30 km C	Anders Bergström	1'40:30.8	23
30 km C	Per Elofsson	1'38:47.0	10
50 km F	Henrik Forsberg	DNF	–
50 km F	Torgny Mogren	2'17:28.8	34
50 km F	Mathias Fredriksson	2'14:05.9	20
50 km F	Niklas Jonsson	2'05:16.3	2nd place, silver medalist(s)

^{1} Starting delay based on 10 km results.
C = Classical style, F = Freestyle

Men's 4 × 10 km relay

Athletes	Race	
Athletes	Time	Rank
Mathias Fredriksson; Niklas Jonsson; Per Elofsson; Henrik Forsberg	1'42:25.2	4

Women

Event	Athlete	Race	
Event	Athlete	Time	Rank
5 km C	Elin Ek	19:19.2	43
5 km C	Karin Säterkvist	19:12.9	36
5 km C	Antonina Ordina	18:50.7	24
10 km pursuit^{2} F	Karin Säterkvist	31:49.4	28
10 km pursuit^{2} F	Antonina Ordina	30:35.6	19
15 km C	Elin Ek	51:51.0	35
15 km C	Karin Säterkvist	51:02.6	25
15 km C	Antonina Ordina	50:12.6	19
30 km F	Karin Säterkvist	1'34:15.1	45
30 km F	Anette Fanqvist	1'33:10.7	37
30 km F	Antonina Ordina	1'26:13.8	11

^{2} Starting delay based on 5 km results.
C = Classical style, F = Freestyle

Women's 4 × 5 km relay

Athletes	Race	
Athletes	Time	Rank
Antonina Ordina; Anette Fanqvist; Magdalena Forsberg; Karin Säterkvist	57:53.7	8

== Curling ==
Summary

Team	Event	Group stage								Tiebreaker	Semifinal	Final / BM	
Team	Event	Opposition Score	Opposition Score	Opposition Score	Opposition Score	Opposition Score	Opposition Score	Opposition Score	Rank	Opposition Score	Opposition Score	Opposition Score	Rank
Peja Lindholm; Tomas Nordin; Magnus Swartling; Peter Narup; Marcus Feldt	Men's tournament	USA; W 6–2	JPN; L 5–6	GER; W 7–6	GBR; W 7–5	NOR; L 4–7	CAN; L 3–6	SUI; L 2–8	=4 QT	USA; L 2–5	did not advance		6
Elisabet Gustafson; Katarina Nyberg; Louise Marmont; Elisabeth Persson; Margaretha Lindahl	Women's tournament	NOR; W 8–2	USA; W 8–5	DEN; W 5–4	JPN; W 12–6	GER; W 8–3	CAN; L 5–7	GBR; W 8–5	2 Q	BYE	DEN; L 5–7	GBR; W 10–6	3rd place, bronze medalist(s)

=== Men's tournament ===
==== Group stage ====
Top four teams advanced to semi-finals.

Country	Skip	W	L
Canada	Mike Harris	6	1
Norway	Eigil Ramsfjell	5	2
Switzerland	Patrick Hürlimann	5	2
United States	Tim Somerville	3	4
Japan	Makoto Tsuruga	3	4
Sweden 6th	Peja Lindholm	3	4
Great Britain	Douglas Dryburgh	2	5
Germany	Andy Kapp	1	6

Team 1	Score	Team 2
United States	2–6	Sweden
Japan	6–5	Sweden
Germany	6–7	Sweden
Sweden	7–5	United Kingdom
Norway	7–4	Sweden
Sweden	3–6	Canada
Sweden	2–8	Switzerland

Tie-breaker

Team 1	Score	Team 2
United States	5-2	Sweden

Contestants

Skip	Third	Second	Lead	Alternate
Peja Lindholm	Tomas Nordin	Magnus Swartling	Peter Narup	Marcus Feldt

=== Women's tournament ===
==== Group stage ====
Top four teams advanced to semi-finals.

Country	Skip	W	L
Canada	Sandra Schmirler	6	1
Sweden	Elisabet Gustafson	6	1
Denmark	Helena Blach Lavrsen	5	2
Great Britain	Kirsty Hay	4	3
Japan	Mayumi Ohkutsu	2	5
Norway	Dordi Nordby	2	5
United States	Lisa Schoeneberg	2	5
Germany	Andrea Schöpp	1	6

Team 1	Score	Team 2
Norway	2–8	Sweden
Sweden	8–5	United States
Sweden	5–4	Denmark
Japan	6–12	Sweden
Germany	3–8	Sweden
Sweden	5–7	Canada
United Kingdom	5–8	Sweden

==== Medal round ====
Semi-finals

Sheet D	1	2	3	4	5	6	7	8	9	10	Final
Denmark (Lavrsen) 🔨	1	0	0	1	2	2	1	0	0	X	7
Sweden (Gustafson)	0	0	2	0	0	0	0	2	1	X	5

Bronze medal match

Sheet C	1	2	3	4	5	6	7	8	9	10	Final
Sweden (Gustafson) 🔨 (bronze)	2	0	2	0	1	0	4	1	0	X	10
Great Britain (Hay)	0	1	0	2	0	2	0	0	1	X	6

Contestants	Skip	Third	Second	Lead	Alternate
Bronze medal	Elisabet Gustafson	Katarina Nyberg	Louise Marmont	Elizabeth Persson	Margaretha Lindahl

== Figure skating ==
Women

Athlete	SP	FS	TFP	Rank
Helena Grundberg	26	DNF	DNF	–

== Freestyle skiing ==
Men

Athlete	Event	Qualification			Final		
Athlete	Event	Time	Points	Rank	Time	Points	Rank
Roger Hållander	Moguls	26.80	23.35	22	did not advance		
Jesper Rönnbäck	Moguls	27.81	24.16	14 Q	25.28	25.32	6
Patrik Sundberg	Moguls	27.30	24.19	13 Q	25.66	23.00	14
Kurre Lansburgh	Moguls	28.31	25.14	4 Q	26.23	24.71	9

Women

Athlete	Event	Qualification			Final		
Athlete	Event	Time	Points	Rank	Time	Points	Rank
Jenny Eidolf	Moguls	32.24	19.74	21	did not advance		
Sara Kjellin	Moguls	34.83	21.59	14 Q	32.83	21.52	14
Marja Elfman	Moguls	32.63	23.03	5 Q	32.59	22.58	12
Liselotte Johansson	Aerials		140.23	18	did not advance		

== Ice hockey ==
Summary

Key:

- OT – Overtime
- GWS – Match decided by penalty-shootout

Team	Event	Group stage						Quarterfinal	Semifinal	Final / BM	
Team	Event	Opposition Score	Opposition Score	Opposition Score	Opposition Score	Opposition Score	Rank	Opposition Score	Opposition Score	Opposition Score	Rank
Sweden men's	Men's tournament	United States; W 4–2	Canada; L 2–3	Belarus; W 5–2	—N/a		2	Finland; L 1–2	did not advance		5
Sweden women's	Women's tournament	Finland; L 0–6	United States; L 1–7	Canada; L 3–5	China; L 1–3	Japan; W 5–0	5	—N/a		Did not advance	5

=== Men's tournament ===
==== First round – group C ====
Team	GP	W	L	T	GF	GA	GD	Pts
Canada	3	3	0	0	12	3	+9	6
Sweden	3	2	1	0	11	7	+4	4
United States	3	1	2	0	8	10	-2	2
Belarus	3	0	3	0	4	15	-11	0

All times are local (UTC-7).

13 February 1998	Sweden	4 – 2 (1-2, 2-0, 1-0)	United States	The Big Hat/ Aqua Wing Arena, Nagano, Japan; Attendance: 9,985

14 February 1998	Canada	3 – 2 (0-1, 3-0, 0-1)	Sweden	The Big Hat/ Aqua Wing Arena, Nagano, Japan; Attendance: 9,945

16 February 1998	Sweden	5 – 2 (0-2, 1-1, 1-2)	Belarus	The Big Hat/ Aqua Wing Arena, Nagano, Japan; Attendance: 4,235

==== Quarter-final ====
All times are local (UTC-7).

18 February 1998	Finland	2 – 1 (0-0, 0-0, 2-1)	Sweden	The Big Hat/ Aqua Wing Arena, Nagano, Japan; Attendance: 5,044

- Team roster
  - Johan Hedberg
  - Tommy Salo
  - Tommy Söderström
  - Tommy Albelin
  - Calle Johansson
  - Nicklas Lidström
  - Mattias Norström
  - Marcus Ragnarsson
  - Ulf Samuelsson
  - Mattias Öhlund
  - Daniel Alfredsson
  - Mikael Andersson
  - Ulf Dahlén
  - Peter Forsberg
  - Andreas Johansson
  - Jörgen Jönsson
  - Patric Kjellberg
  - Mats Lindgren
  - Michael Nylander
  - Mikael Renberg
  - Tomas Sandström
  - Mats Sundin
  - Niklas Sundström
- Head coach: Kent Forsberg

=== Women's tournament ===
The First 4 teams (shaded green) advanced to medal round games.

Team	GP	W	L	T	GF	GA	Pts
United States	5	5	0	0	33	7	10
Canada	5	4	1	0	28	12	8
Finland	5	3	2	0	27	10	6
China	5	2	3	0	10	15	4
Sweden 5th	5	1	4	0	10	21	2
Japan	5	0	5	0	2	45	0

Team 1	Score	Team 2
Sweden	0–6	Finland
United States	7–1	Sweden
Sweden	3–5	Canada
China	3–1	Sweden
Japan	0–5	Sweden

Contestants; Annica Åhlén; Lotta Almblad; Gunilla Andersson; Kristina Bergstrand; Pernilla Burholm; Susanne Ceder; Ann-Louise Edstrand; Joa Elfsberg; Åsa Elfving; Anne Ferm; Lotta Göthesson; Linda Gustafsson; Malin Gustafsson; Erika Holst; Åsa Lidström; Ylva Lindberg; Tina Månsson; Pia Morelius; Maria Rooth; Therese Sjölander

== Luge ==
Men

Athlete	Run 1		Run 2		Run 3		Run 4		Total	
Athlete	Time	Rank	Time	Rank	Time	Rank	Time	Rank	Time	Rank
Anders Söderberg	50.878	23	50.696	21	50.708	18	50.747	21	3:23.029	21
Bengt Walden	50.750	21	50.479	18	50.722	20	50.601	18	3:22.552	19
Mikael Holm	50.324	11	50.197	14	50.146	13	50.131	10	3:20.798	11

(Men's) Doubles

Athletes	Run 1		Run 2		Total	
Athletes	Time	Rank	Time	Rank	Time	Rank
Anders Söderberg; Bengt Walden	51.725	14	51.137	11	1:42.862	12

== Short track speed skating ==
Men

Athlete	Event	Round one		Quarter-finals		Semi-finals		Finals	
Athlete	Event	Time	Rank	Time	Rank	Time	Rank	Time	Final rank
Martin Johansson	500 m	44.003	3	did not advance					
Martin Johansson	1000 m	1:31.515	1 Q	1:33.047	4	did not advance			

== Snowboarding ==
Men's giant slalom

Athlete	Race 1	Race 2	Total	
Athlete	Time	Time	Time	Rank
Stephen Copp	1:04.14	1:07.75	2:11.89	18
Richard Richardsson	1:02.93	DNF	DNF	–

Men's halfpipe

Athlete	Qualifying round 1		Qualifying round 2		Final	
Athlete	Points	Rank	Points	Rank	Points	Rank
Jacob Söderqvist	30.9	30	39.2	8 QF	77.8	6
Fredrik Sterner	32.4	25	36.5	15	did not advance	
Pontus Ståhlkloo	33.5	22	37.9	10	did not advance	
Ingemar Backman	35.5	17	37.0	14	did not advance	

Women's giant slalom

Athlete	Race 1	Race 2	Total	
Athlete	Time	Time	Time	Rank
Marie Birkl	1:15.99	1:07.92	2:23.91	10

Women's halfpipe

Athlete	Qualifying round 1		Qualifying round 2		Final	
Athlete	Points	Rank	Points	Rank	Points	Rank
Anna Hellman	20.0	26	22.7	18	did not advance	
Jennie Waara	31.9	10	34.5	4 QF	62.7	8
Jenny Jonsson	34.5	3 QF			65.9	7
