= Ice hockey at the 1998 Winter Olympics – Women's team rosters =

These are the team rosters of the nations that participated in the women's ice hockey tournament of the 1998 Winter Olympics.

Ages and clubs listed as of the start of the tournament, 8 February 1998.

== Canada ==
The Canadian roster was announced on 9 December, 1997.

Head coach: (Canada) Shannon Miller
Assistant coaches: (Canada) Danièle Sauvageau, (Canada) Ray Bennett, (Canada) Rob Cookson

No.	Pos.	Name	Height	Weight	Birthdate	Birthplace	1997–98 team
3	F	France Saint-Louis	5 ft 8 in (1.73 m)	145 lb (66 kg)	17 October 1958 (aged 39)	Saint-Hubert, Quebec	(Canada) National Team
4	D	Becky Kellar	5 ft 7 in (1.70 m)	150 lb (68 kg)	1 January 1975 (aged 23)	Hagersville, Ontario	(Canada) National Team
6	D	Thérèse Brisson – A	5 ft 7 in (1.70 m)	150 lb (68 kg)	10 May 1975 (aged 22)	Fredericton, New Brunswick	(Canada) National Team
7	F	Jennifer Botterill	5 ft 9 in (1.75 m)	157 lb (71 kg)	1 May 1979 (aged 18)	Winnipeg, Manitoba	(Canada) National Team
9	D	Fiona Smith-Bell	5 ft 2 in (1.57 m)	124 lb (56 kg)	31 October 1973 (aged 24)	Edam, Saskatchewan	(Canada) National Team
12	F	Lori Dupuis	5 ft 8 in (1.73 m)	165 lb (75 kg)	14 November 1972 (aged 25)	Williamstown, Ontario	(Canada) National Team
14	F	Kathy McCormack	5 ft 9 in (1.75 m)	165 lb (75 kg)	16 February 1974 (aged 23)	Fredericton, New Brunswick	(Canada) National Team
15	F	Danielle Goyette	5 ft 7 in (1.70 m)	143 lb (65 kg)	30 January 1966 (aged 32)	Saint-Nazaire, Quebec	(Canada) National Team
16	F	Jayna Hefford	5 ft 5 in (1.65 m)	135 lb (61 kg)	14 May 1977 (aged 20)	Kingston, Ontario	(Canada) National Team
17	F	Stacy Wilson – C	5 ft 6 in (1.68 m)	130 lb (59 kg)	12 May 1965 (aged 32)	Salisbury, New Brunswick	(Canada) National Team
18	F	Nancy Drolet	5 ft 6 in (1.68 m)	138 lb (63 kg)	2 August 1973 (aged 24)	Drummondville, Quebec	(Canada) National Team
21	D	Judy Diduck	5 ft 6 in (1.68 m)	145 lb (66 kg)	21 April 1966 (aged 31)	Sherwood Park, Alberta	(Canada) National Team
22	F	Hayley Wickenheiser	5 ft 9 in (1.75 m)	170 lb (77 kg)	8 December 1978 (aged 19)	Calgary, Alberta	(Canada) National Team
27	F	Laura Schuler	5 ft 6 in (1.68 m)	142 lb (64 kg)	3 December 1970 (aged 27)	Scarborough, Ontario	(Canada) National Team
30	G	Lesley Reddon	5 ft 8 in (1.73 m)	130 lb (59 kg)	15 November 1970 (aged 27)	Fredericton, New Brunswick	(Canada) National Team
33	G	Manon Rhéaume	5 ft 7 in (1.70 m)	132 lb (60 kg)	24 February 1972 (aged 25)	Charlesbourg, Quebec	(Canada) National Team
61	F	Vicky Sunohara	5 ft 7 in (1.70 m)	160 lb (73 kg)	18 May 1970 (aged 27)	Scarborough, Ontario	(Canada) National Team
77	D	Cassie Campbell	5 ft 6 in (1.68 m)	134 lb (61 kg)	22 November 1973 (aged 24)	Brampton, Ontario	(Canada) National Team
89	F	Karen Nystrom	5 ft 6 in (1.68 m)	140 lb (64 kg)	17 June 1969 (aged 28)	Scarborough, Ontario	(Canada) National Team
91	D	Geraldine Heaney	5 ft 7 in (1.70 m)	135 lb (61 kg)	1 October 1967 (aged 30)	North York, Ontario	(Canada) National Team

== China ==
The Chinese roster for the women's ice hockey tournament at the 1998 Winter Olympics:

Head coach: (China) Zhang Zhinan

No.	Pos.	Name	Height	Weight	Birthdate	Province of birth	1997–98 team
1	G	Huo Lina	165 cm (5 ft 5 in)	74 kg (163 lb)	30 March 1973 (aged 24)		(China) Harbin Ice Hockey
2	D	Gong Ming	171 cm (5 ft 7 in)	68 kg (150 lb)	15 February 1973 (aged 24)		(China) Harbin Ice Hockey
3	F	Liu Hongmei – A	162 cm (5 ft 4 in)	58 kg (128 lb)	27 December 1973 (aged 24)	Shandong	(China) Harbin Ice Hockey
4	D	Li Xuan	169 cm (5 ft 7 in)	67 kg (148 lb)	29 February 1972 (aged 25)	Hebei	(China) Harbin Ice Hockey
5	F	Dang Hong – C	168 cm (5 ft 6 in)	60 kg (130 lb)	28 January 1969 (aged 29)		(China) Harbin Ice Hockey
6	D	Lu Yan	166 cm (5 ft 5 in)	60 kg (130 lb)	25 July 1972 (aged 25)	Shandong	(China) Harbin Ice Hockey
7	F	Zhang Lan	166 cm (5 ft 5 in)	57 kg (126 lb)	18 September 1968 (aged 29)		(China) Harbin Ice Hockey
8	F	Yang Xiuqing	170 cm (5 ft 7 in)	80 kg (180 lb)	9 February 1975 (aged 22)		(China) Harbin Ice Hockey
9	F	Sang Hong	163 cm (5 ft 4 in)	60 kg (130 lb)	9 February 1975 (aged 22)	Heilongjiang	(China) Harbin Ice Hockey
10	D	Chen Jing	166 cm (5 ft 5 in)	65 kg (143 lb)	22 April 1971 (aged 26)	Shandong	(China) Harbin Ice Hockey
12	F	Diao Ying	162 cm (5 ft 4 in)	62 kg (137 lb)	24 November 1974 (aged 23)		(China) Harbin Ice Hockey
13	D	Zhang Jing	166 cm (5 ft 5 in)	56 kg (123 lb)	18 March 1977 (aged 20)	Hebei	(China) Harbin Ice Hockey
14	F	Guo Wei	169 cm (5 ft 7 in)	67 kg (148 lb)	7 November 1969 (aged 28)		(China) Harbin Ice Hockey
15	F	Xu Lei	163 cm (5 ft 4 in)	68 kg (150 lb)	26 January 1977 (aged 21)	Heilongjiang	(China) Harbin Ice Hockey
16	F	Guo Lili	166 cm (5 ft 5 in)	60 kg (130 lb)	5 May 1976 (aged 21)		(China) Harbin Ice Hockey
17	D	Wang Wei	164 cm (5 ft 5 in)	68 kg (150 lb)	15 February 1977 (aged 20)		(China) Harbin Ice Hockey
18	F	Ma Jinping	162 cm (5 ft 4 in)	62 kg (137 lb)	1 January 1972 (aged 26)		(China) Harbin Ice Hockey
19	F	Ma Xiaojun	166 cm (5 ft 5 in)	65 kg (143 lb)	12 July 1978 (aged 19)	Heilongjiang	(China) Harbin Ice Hockey
20	G	Guo Hong	172 cm (5 ft 8 in)	66 kg (146 lb)	1 May 1973 (aged 24)	Heilongjiang	(China) Harbin Ice Hockey
21	D	Liu Chunhua	172 cm (5 ft 8 in)	67 kg (148 lb)	6 May 1974 (aged 23)		(China) Harbin Ice Hockey

== Finland ==
The Finnish roster for the women's ice hockey tournament at the 1998 Winter Olympics.

Head coach: (Finland) Rauno Korpi
Assistant coach: (Finland) Jorma Kurjenmäki

No.	Pos.	Name	Height	Weight	Birthdate	Birthplace	1997–98 team
1	G	Liisa-Maria Sneck	1.67 m (5 ft 6 in)	80 kg (180 lb)	10 November 1968 (aged 29)	Helsinki	(Finland) Shakers Kerava
3	D	Emma Laaksonen	1.59 m (5 ft 3 in)	60 kg (130 lb)	17 December 1981 (aged 16)	Washington, D.C.	(Finland) Kiekko-Espoo
4	D	Katja Lehto	1.60 m (5 ft 3 in)	58 kg (128 lb)	14 August 1972 (aged 25)	Jyväskylä	(Finland) JYP Jyväskylä
5	D	Satu Huotari	1.62 m (5 ft 4 in)	63 kg (139 lb)	13 March 1967 (aged 30)	Oulu	(Finland) Kärpät Oulu
9	F	Marianne Ihalainen – C	1.65 m (5 ft 5 in)	68 kg (150 lb)	22 February 1967 (aged 30)	Tampere	(Finland) Ilves Tampere
10	F	Sari Fisk	1.64 m (5 ft 5 in)	65 kg (143 lb)	17 December 1971 (aged 26)	Pori	(Finland) Ilves Tampere
13	F	Riikka Nieminen – A	1.63 m (5 ft 4 in)	60 kg (130 lb)	12 June 1973 (aged 24)	Jyväskylä	(Finland) JYP Jyväskylä
14	F	Maria Selin	1.62 m (5 ft 4 in)	52 kg (115 lb)	8 September 1977 (aged 20)	Helsinki	(Finland) Kiekko-Espoo
15	D	Johanna Ikonen	1.62 m (5 ft 4 in)	63 kg (139 lb)	9 January 1969 (aged 29)	Eno	(Finland) Kiekko-Espoo
16	F	Tiia Reima	1.59 m (5 ft 3 in)	57 kg (126 lb)	1 February 1973 (aged 25)	Tampere	(Finland) Ilves Tampere
17	F	Sari Krooks	1.61 m (5 ft 3 in)	53 kg (117 lb)	2 February 1968 (aged 30)	Vaasa	(Finland) Ilves Tampere
19	G	Tuula Puputti	1.62 m (5 ft 4 in)	60 kg (130 lb)	5 November 1977 (aged 20)	Kuopio	(Finland) JYP Jyväskylä
20	D	Kirsi Hänninen – A	1.75 m (5 ft 9 in)	68 kg (150 lb)	3 October 1976 (aged 21)	Joensuu	(Finland) Kärpät Oulu
21	F	Petra Vaarakallio	1.76 m (5 ft 9 in)	73 kg (161 lb)	17 June 1975 (aged 22)	Helsinki	(Finland) Kiekko-Espoo
22	F	Sanna Lankosaari	1.62 m (5 ft 4 in)	63 kg (139 lb)	20 August 1978 (aged 19)	Kemi	(Finland) Kärpät Oulu
25	D	Marja-Helena Pälvilä	1.76 m (5 ft 9 in)	70 kg (150 lb)	4 March 1970 (aged 27)	Oulu	(Finland) Kärpät Oulu
26	F	Marika Lehtimäki	1.64 m (5 ft 5 in)	70 kg (150 lb)	7 February 1975 (aged 23)	Tampere	(Finland) Ilves Tampere
27	D	Päivi Salo	1.65 m (5 ft 5 in)	58 kg (128 lb)	31 January 1974 (aged 24)	Orimattila	(Finland) Kärpät Oulu
28	F	Katja Riipi	1.59 m (5 ft 3 in)	65 kg (143 lb)	26 October 1975 (aged 22)	Sodankylä	(Finland) Kärpät Oulu
29	F	Karoliina Rantamäki	1.63 m (5 ft 4 in)	65 kg (143 lb)	23 February 1978 (aged 19)	Vantaa	(Finland) Kiekko-Espoo

== Japan ==
The Japan roster for the women's ice hockey tournament at the 1998 Winter Olympics.

Head coach: (Japan) Toru Itabashi

No.	Pos.	Name	Height	Weight	Birthdate	Birthplace	1997–98 team
1	G	Yuka Oda	1.61 m (5 ft 3 in)	54 kg (119 lb)	15 March 1973 (aged 24)	Muroran	(Japan) Iwakura Peregrine
2	D	Yoko Kondo	1.65 m (5 ft 5 in)	60 kg (130 lb)	13 February 1979 (aged 18)	Hachinohe	(Japan) Kokudo IHC
3	D	Rie Sato	1.61 m (5 ft 3 in)	60 kg (130 lb)	31 January 1972 (aged 26)	Tomakomai	(Japan) Iwakura Peregrine
4	D	Akiko Hatanaka	1.63 m (5 ft 4 in)	63 kg (139 lb)	23 April 1975 (aged 22)	Sakai	(Japan) Iwakura Peregrine
5	D	Chie Sakuma	1.58 m (5 ft 2 in)	63 kg (139 lb)	1 March 1972 (aged 25)	Houston, Texas	(Japan) Iwakura Peregrine
6	D	Maiko Obikawa	1.61 m (5 ft 3 in)	67 kg (148 lb)	13 March 1973 (aged 24)	Tomakomai	(Japan) Iwakura Peregrine
7	F	Satomi Ono	1.75 m (5 ft 9 in)	70 kg (150 lb)	18 November 1975 (aged 22)	Tomakomai	(Japan) Iwakura Peregrine
8	D	Naho Yoshimi	1.60 m (5 ft 3 in)	57 kg (126 lb)	31 January 1972 (aged 26)	Meguro	(Japan) Kokudo IHC
9	D	Yukio Satomi	1.60 m (5 ft 3 in)	55 kg (121 lb)	22 October 1975 (aged 22)	Sapporo	(Japan) Sports SF
10	F	Yuki Togawa	1.53 m (5 ft 0 in)	56 kg (123 lb)	28 February 1978 (aged 19)	Kushiro	(Japan) Rokkatei Bears
11	F	Miharu Araki	1.61 m (5 ft 3 in)	49 kg (108 lb)	20 July 1971 (aged 26)	Tochigi Prefecture	(Japan) Iwakura Peregrine
12	F	Ayumi Sato	1.60 m (5 ft 3 in)	56 kg (123 lb)	16 July 1977 (aged 20)	Morioka	(Japan) Kokudo IHC / Rokkatei Bears
13	F	Mitsuko Igarashi	1.58 m (5 ft 2 in)	53 kg (117 lb)	21 August 1977 (aged 20)	Tomakomai	(Japan) Iwakura Peregrine
14	F	Yukari Ohno	1.67 m (5 ft 6 in)	63 kg (139 lb)	10 August 1975 (aged 22)	Shinjuku	(Japan) Kokudo IHC
15	F	Masako Sato	1.58 m (5 ft 2 in)	56 kg (123 lb)	9 June 1973 (aged 24)	Tomakomai	(Japan) Iwakura Peregrine
16	F	Aki Sudo	1.56 m (5 ft 1 in)	53 kg (117 lb)	20 January 1975 (aged 23)	Kushiro	(Japan) Rokkatei Bears
17	F	Shiho Fujiwara	1.50 m (4 ft 11 in)	60 kg (130 lb)	16 November 1971 (aged 26)	Monbetsu, Hidaka	(Japan) Iwakura Peregrine
18	F	Aki Tsuchida	1.56 m (5 ft 1 in)	56 kg (123 lb)	29 May 1979 (aged 18)	Kushiro	(Japan) Rokkatei Bears
19	F	Akiko Naka	1.57 m (5 ft 2 in)	58 kg (128 lb)	5 June 1980 (aged 17)	Sapporo	(Japan) Sports SF
20	G	Haruka Watanabe	1.65 m (5 ft 5 in)	54 kg (119 lb)	13 December 1972 (aged 25)	Ashikaga	(Japan) Kokudo IHC

== Sweden ==
The following is the Swedish roster for the women's ice hockey tournament at the 1998 Winter Olympics.

Head coach: (Sweden) Bengt Ohlson
Assistant coach: (Sweden) Christian Yngve

No.	Pos.	Name	Height	Weight	Birthdate	Birthplace	1997–98 team
1	G	Charlotte Göthesson	1.75 m (5 ft 9 in)	70 kg (150 lb)	17 January 1975 (aged 23)	Krokek	(Sweden) FOC Farsta
4	D	Linda Gustafsson	1.74 m (5 ft 9 in)	90 kg (200 lb)	20 February 1974 (aged 23)	Umeå	(Sweden) Modo Hockey
7	F	Maria Rooth	1.72 m (5 ft 8 in)	60 kg (130 lb)	2 November 1979 (aged 18)	Ängelholm	(Sweden) Helsingborgs HC J18 / Veddige HK
8	F	Erika Holst	1.76 m (5 ft 9 in)	72 kg (159 lb)	28 April 1979 (aged 18)	Varberg	(Sweden) FOC Farsta
11	F	Kristina Bergstrand	1.63 m (5 ft 4 in)	65 kg (143 lb)	4 October 1963 (aged 34)	Stockholm	(Sweden) Nacka HK
12	F	Malin Gustafsson	1.68 m (5 ft 6 in)	62 kg (137 lb)	24 January 1980 (aged 18)	Skellefteå	(Sweden) Lövånger AIK / Veddige HK
15	F	Lotta Almblad	1.71 m (5 ft 7 in)	68 kg (150 lb)	28 April 1972 (aged 25)	Stenbrohult	(Sweden) FOC Farsta
18	F	Åsa Elfving – A	1.73 m (5 ft 8 in)	70 kg (150 lb)	1 February 1970 (aged 28)	Umeå	(Sweden) Nacka HK
19	F	Tina Månsson	1.66 m (5 ft 5 in)	64 kg (141 lb)	22 April 1968 (aged 29)	Mariefred	(Sweden) FOC Farsta
20	D	Pernilla Burholm	1.64 m (5 ft 5 in)	60 kg (130 lb)	16 February 1974 (aged 23)	Härnösand	(Sweden) Nacka HK
21	F	Joa Elfsberg	1.77 m (5 ft 10 in)	66 kg (146 lb)	30 July 1979 (aged 18)	Valbo	(Sweden) Valbo AIF
22	F	Anne Ferm	1.69 m (5 ft 7 in)	61 kg (134 lb)	26 August 1969 (aged 28)	Kalmar	(Sweden) Nacka HK
23	D	Gunilla Andersson	1.69 m (5 ft 7 in)	61 kg (134 lb)	26 April 1974 (aged 23)	Skutskär	(Sweden) FOC Farsta
24	F	Ann-Louise Edstrand	1.77 m (5 ft 10 in)	67 kg (148 lb)	25 April 1975 (aged 22)	Örnsköldsvik	(Sweden) Nacka HK
25	D	Therese Sjölander	1.73 m (5 ft 8 in)	62 kg (137 lb)	4 May 1981 (aged 16)	Sollefteå	(Sweden) Sollefteå HK / Modo Hockey
26	D	Pia Morelius – A	1.63 m (5 ft 4 in)	65 kg (143 lb)	31 March 1966 (aged 31)	Stockholm	(Sweden) FOC Farsta
27	D	Ylva Lindberg	1.65 m (5 ft 5 in)	70 kg (150 lb)	29 June 1976 (aged 21)	Umeå	(Sweden) Nacka HK
28	F	Susanne Ceder – C	1.67 m (5 ft 6 in)	68 kg (150 lb)	30 June 1967 (aged 30)	Örnsköldsvik	(Finland) Shakers Kerava (NSMs)
29	D	Åsa Lidström	1.70 m (5 ft 7 in)	72 kg (159 lb)	15 August 1968 (aged 29)	Mullsjö	(Sweden) FOC Farsta
30	G	Annica Åhlén	1.68 m (5 ft 6 in)	62 kg (137 lb)	23 June 1975 (aged 22)	Trångsund	(Sweden) AIK IF

== United States ==
The following is the United States roster for the women's ice hockey tournament at the 1998 Winter Olympics.

Head coach: (United States) Ben Smith
Assistant coach: (United States) Tom Mutch

No.	Pos.	Name	Height	Weight	Birthdate	Birthplace	1996–97 team
1	G	Sara DeCosta	5 ft 9 in (1.75 m)	130 lb (59 kg)	13 May 1977 (aged 20)	Warwick, Rhode Island	(United States) Providence College
2	D	Tara Mounsey	5 ft 6 in (1.68 m)	150 lb (68 kg)	12 March 1978 (aged 19)	Concord, New Hampshire	(United States) Brown University
3	F	Lisa Brown-Miller	5 ft 1 in (1.55 m)	128 lb (58 kg)	16 November 1966 (aged 31)	Union Lake, Michigan	(United States) National Team
4	D	Angela Ruggiero	5 ft 9 in (1.75 m)	175 lb (79 kg)	3 January 1980 (aged 18)	Panorama City, California	(United States) Choate Rosemary Hall
5	D	Colleen Coyne	5 ft 3 in (1.60 m)	131 lb (59 kg)	19 September 1971 (aged 26)	Medford, Massachusetts	(United States) National Team
6	F	Karyn Bye – A	5 ft 8 in (1.73 m)	160 lb (73 kg)	18 May 1971 (aged 26)	River Falls, Wisconsin	(United States) National Team
7	D	Sue Merz	5 ft 5 in (1.65 m)	145 lb (66 kg)	10 April 1972 (aged 25)	Greenwich, Connecticut	(Canada) Newtonbrook Panthers
8	F	Laurie Baker	5 ft 6 in (1.68 m)	140 lb (64 kg)	6 November 1976 (aged 21)	Concord, Massachusetts	(United States) Providence College
9	F	Sandra Whyte	5 ft 7 in (1.70 m)	130 lb (59 kg)	24 August 1970 (aged 27)	Saugus, Massachusetts	(United States) National Team
11	F	A. J. Mleczko	5 ft 11 in (1.80 m)	160 lb (73 kg)	14 June 1975 (aged 22)	Nantucket, Massachusetts	(United States) National Team
12	F	Jenny Schmidgall	5 ft 3 in (1.60 m)	130 lb (59 kg)	12 January 1979 (aged 19)	Saint Paul, Minnesota	(United States) Edina High School
14	D	Vicki Movsessian	5 ft 5 in (1.65 m)	140 lb (64 kg)	6 November 1972 (aged 25)	Lexington, Massachusetts	(United States) National Team
15	F	Shelley Looney	5 ft 5 in (1.65 m)	140 lb (64 kg)	21 January 1972 (aged 26)	Brownstown Township, Michigan	(United States) National Team
18	F	Alana Blahoski	5 ft 7 in (1.70 m)	127 lb (58 kg)	29 April 1974 (aged 23)	Saint Paul, Minnesota	(United States) National Team
20	F	Katie King	5 ft 8 in (1.73 m)	165 lb (75 kg)	24 May 1975 (aged 22)	Salem, New Hampshire	(United States) Brown University
21	F	Cammi Granato – C	5 ft 7 in (1.70 m)	140 lb (64 kg)	25 March 1971 (aged 26)	Downers Grove, Illinois	(United States) Concordia University
22	F	Gretchen Ulion	5 ft 2 in (1.57 m)	130 lb (59 kg)	4 May 1972 (aged 25)	Marlborough, Connecticut	(United States) National Team
24	D	Chris Bailey	5 ft 6 in (1.68 m)	160 lb (73 kg)	5 February 1972 (aged 26)	Marietta, New York	(United States) National Team
25	F	Tricia Dunn	5 ft 8 in (1.73 m)	142 lb (64 kg)	25 April 1974 (aged 23)	Derry, New Hampshire	(United States) National Team
29	G	Sarah Tueting	5 ft 7 in (1.70 m)	140 lb (64 kg)	26 April 1976 (aged 21)	Winnetka, Illinois	(United States) National Team

== Bibliography ==
- Podnieks, Andrew; Nordmark, Birger, eds. (2019). "Olympics, Women". IIHF Guide & Record Book 2020. Toronto: Moydart. p. 315. ISBN 9780986796470.
