= 1996 IIHF European Women Championships =

The 1996 IIHF European Women Championships were the sixth and final holding of the IIHF European Women Championships. The tournaments were held in March 1996, with Pool A playing in Yaroslavl, Russia during 23–29 March and Pool B playing in Trnava and Piešťany, Slovakia during 12–16 March.

The format remained unchanged from the previous year, with promoted Russia replacing relegated Denmark in the Pool A tournament.

The tournament was the final European Championship ever to be held, as the International Ice Hockey Federation expanded the World Championships to include tiered divisions.

== European Championship Group A ==
1996 IIHF European Women's Championship
Pool A

Tournament details
- Host country: Russia
- Venue: 1 (in 1 host city)
- Dates: 23–29 March
- Teams: 6

Final positions
- Champions: Sweden (1st title)
- Runners-up: Russia
- Third place: Finland
- Fourth place: Norway

Tournament statistics
- Games played: 15
- Goals scored: 95 (6.33 per game)
- Scoring leader: (Russia) Yekaterina Pashkevich (6+3=9)

=== Teams & Format ===
Six teams completed in Pool A, with Russia joining the group after winning the 1995 Pool B tournament. The teams were:

- Finland
- Germany
- Norway
- Russia
- Switzerland
- Sweden

A single round-robin tournament was played between the teams, with the top ranked team winning the championship.

=== Tournament ===
==== Standings ====
| Pos | Team | Pld | W | D | L | GF | GA | GD | Pts |
|---|---|---|---|---|---|---|---|---|---|
| 1 | Sweden | 5 | 4 | 1 | 0 | 20 | 11 | +9 | 9 |
| 2 | Russia | 5 | 4 | 0 | 1 | 17 | 15 | +2 | 8 |
| 3 | Finland | 5 | 3 | 0 | 2 | 26 | 5 | +21 | 6 |
| 4 | Norway | 5 | 2 | 0 | 3 | 14 | 21 | −7 | 4 |
| 5 | Switzerland | 5 | 1 | 0 | 4 | 11 | 23 | −12 | 2 |
| 6 | Germany | 5 | 0 | 1 | 4 | 7 | 20 | −13 | 1 |

==== Results ====
| 23 March 1996 | Norway | 3 – 6 (0 – 2, 1 – 3, 2 – 1) | Sweden | Yaroslavl |

| 23 March 1996 | Germany | 2 – 3 (0 – 1, 1 – 0, 1 – 2) | Switzerland | Yaroslavl |

| 23 March 1996 | Finland | 2 – 3 (2 – 0, 0 – 2, 0 – 1) | Russia | Yaroslavl |

| 24 March 1996 | Sweden | 2 – 2 (0 – 0, 0 – 1, 2 – 1) | Germany | Yaroslavl |

| 24 March 1996 | Finland | 7 – 0 (3 – 0, 1 – 0, 3 – 0) | Norway | Yaroslavl |

| 24 March 1996 | Switzerland | 3 – 4 (0 – 1, 1 – 3, 2 – 0) | Russia | Yaroslavl |

| 26 March 1996 | Germany | 0 – 8 (0 – 2, 0 – 3, 0 – 3) | Finland | Yaroslavl |

| 26 March 1996 | Sweden | 6 – 3 (2 – 1, 0 – 1, 4 – 1) | Switzerland | Yaroslavl |

| 26 March 1996 | Russia | 5 – 4 (1 – 1, 1 – 2, 3 – 1) | Norway | Yaroslavl |

| 27 March 1996 | Switzerland | 0 – 8 (0 – 3, 0 – 2, 0 – 3) | Finland | Yaroslavl |

| 27 March 1996 | Norway | 4 – 1 (3 – 0, 0 – 0, 1 – 1) | Germany | Yaroslavl |

| 27 March 1996 | Sweden | 4 – 2 (2 – 0, 1 – 1, 1 – 1) | Russia | Yaroslavl |

| 29 March 1996 | Switzerland | 2 – 3 (1 – 1, 0 – 1, 1 – 1) | Norway | Yaroslavl |

| 29 March 1996 | Finland | 1 – 2 (0 – 1, 0 – 1, 1 – 0) | Sweden | Yaroslavl |

| 29 March 1996 | Russia | 3 – 2 (2 – 0, 1 – 2, 0 – 0) | Germany | Yaroslavl |

=== Champions ===
1996 IIHF European Women Championship winners

Sweden
1st title

=== Awards and statistics ===
==== Awards ====
Best player selected by the Directorate

| Position | Player |
|---|---|
| Goaltender | (Switzerland) Patricia Sautter |
| Defenceman | (Sweden) Pernilla Burholm |
| Forward | (Finland) Sanna Lankosaari |

All-Star team

| Position | Player |
|---|---|
| Goaltender | (Russia) Irina Gashennikova |
| Defenceman | (Finland) Johanna Ikonen |
| Defenceman | (Finland) Anne Haanpää |
| Forward | (Sweden) Åsa Elfving |
| Forward | (Russia) Yekaterina Pashkevich |
| Forward | (Finland) Sanna Lankosaari |

==== Scoring leaders ====
List shows the top skaters sorted by points, then goals.

| Player | GP | G | A | Pts | POS |
|---|---|---|---|---|---|
| (Russia) Yekaterina Pashkevich | 5 | 6 | 3 | 9 | F |
| (Finland) Sanna Lankosaari | 5 | 7 | 1 | 8 | F |
| (Switzerland) Kathrin Lehmann | 5 | 7 | 0 | 7 | F |
| (Norway) Camilla Hille | 5 | 3 | 4 | 7 | F |
| (Finland) Petra Vaarakallio | 5 | 3 | 4 | 7 | F |
| (Russia) Yulia Perova | 5 | 4 | 2 | 6 | F |
| (Sweden) Tina Månsson | 5 | 3 | 3 | 6 | D |
| (Finland) Tiia Reima | 5 | 3 | 3 | 6 | F |

GP = Games played; G = Goals; A = Assists; Pts = Points; +/− = Plus/minus; PIM = Penalties in minutes; POS = Position

=== Rosters ===
| Medal | Team | Players |
|---|---|---|
| 1st place, gold medalist(s) | Sweden | Annica Åhlén, Lotta Almblad, Gunilla Andersson, Pernilla Burholm, Susanne Ceder, Minna Dunder, Ann-Louise Edstrand, Joa Elfsberg, Åsa Elfving, Anne Ferm, Charlotte Götesson, Ann-Sofie Gustafsson, Erika Holst, Marita Johansson, Camilla Kempe, Åsa Lidström, Tina Månsson, Pia Morelius, Ann-Britt Nordqvist, Maria Rooth |
| 2nd place, silver medalist(s) | Russia | Irina Gashennikova, Svetlana Gavrilova, Nataliya Kozlova, Tatyana Malysheva, Rada Maslennikova, Larisa Mishina, Mariya Misropyan, Svetlana Nikolayeva, Yelena Osipova, Yekaterina Pashkevich, Yuliya Perova, Lyudmila Reshetnikova, Elena Rodikova, Zhanna Shchelchkova, Violetta Simonova, Svetlana Trefilova, Tatyana Tsareva, Yuliya Voronina, Irina Votintseva, Lyudmila Yurlova |
| 3rd place, bronze medalist(s) | Finland | Kati Ahonen, Sari Fisk, Anne Haanpaa, Päivi Halonen, Kirsi Hänninen, Johanna Hirvinen, Satu Huotari, Marianne Ihalainen, Johanna Ikonen, Kati Kovalainen, Tuija Kuusisto, Sanna Lankosaari, Marika Lehtimäki, Katri-Helena Luomajoki, Jonna Norppa-Rahkola, Marja-Helena Pälvilä, Tiia Reima, Maria Selin, Petra Vaarakallio |

== European Championship Group B ==
1996 IIHF European Women's Championship
Pool B

Tournament details
- Host country: Slovakia
- Venues: 2 (in 2 host cities)
- Dates: 12–16 March
- Teams: 8

Final positions
- Champions: Denmark (2nd title)
- Runners-up: Latvia
- Third place: Czech Republic
- Fourth place: Slovakia

Tournament statistics
- Games played: 16
- Goals scored: 103 (6.44 per game)
- Attendance: 13,225 (827 per game)
- Scoring leader: (Netherlands) Marion Pepels (5+4=9)

=== Teams & Format ===
The eight teams that competed in Pool B were:

- Czech Republic
- Denmark
- France
- Great Britain
- Latvia
- Kazakhstan
- Netherlands
- Slovakia

Kazakhstan replaced Ukraine after they withdrew from the competition.

The teams were split into two groups of four teams as below. At the end of the group stage, the teams would play the team that finished in the same position in the opposite group in a playoff match, i.e. Winner of Group A played Winner of Group B for the Gold Medal.

=== Group A ===
==== Standings ====
| Pos | Team | Pld | W | D | L | GF | GA | GD | Pts |
|---|---|---|---|---|---|---|---|---|---|
| 1 | Latvia | 3 | 3 | 0 | 0 | 11 | 4 | +7 | 6 |
| 2 | Slovakia | 3 | 2 | 0 | 1 | 9 | 7 | +2 | 4 |
| 3 | France | 3 | 1 | 0 | 2 | 9 | 12 | −3 | 2 |
| 4 | Kazakhstan | 3 | 0 | 0 | 3 | 5 | 11 | −6 | 0 |

==== Results ====
| 12 March 1996; 11:30 am | Latvia | 4 – 2 (2 – 0, 1 – 2, 1 – 0) | Kazakhstan | Trnava |

| 12 March 1996; 6:30 pm | Slovakia | 6 – 3 (3 – 1, 1 – 2, 2 – 0) | France | Trnava |

| 13 March 1996; 3:00 pm | France | 1 – 4 (0 – 3, 1 – 1, 0 – 0) | Latvia | Trnava |

| 13 March 1996; 6:30 pm | Slovakia | 2 – 1 (1 – 1, 0 – 0, 1 – 0) | Kazakhstan | Trnava |

| 15 March 1996; 10:00 am | Kazakhstan | 2 – 5 (0 – 3, 1 – 0, 1 – 2) | France | Trnava |

| 15 March 1996; 5:00 pm | Latvia | 3 – 1 (1 – 0, 1 – 0, 1 – 1) | Slovakia | Trnava |

=== Group B ===
==== Standings ====
| Pos | Team | Pld | W | D | L | GF | GA | GD | Pts |
|---|---|---|---|---|---|---|---|---|---|
| 1 | Denmark | 3 | 3 | 0 | 0 | 13 | 4 | +9 | 6 |
| 2 | Czech Republic | 3 | 1 | 1 | 1 | 14 | 10 | +4 | 3 |
| 3 | Netherlands | 3 | 1 | 1 | 1 | 12 | 8 | +4 | 3 |
| 4 | Great Britain | 3 | 0 | 0 | 3 | 2 | 19 | −17 | 0 |

==== Results ====
| 12 March 1996; 3:00 pm | Czech Republic | 4 – 4 (2 – 1, 2 – 2, 0 – 1) | Netherlands | Trnava |

| 12 March 1996 | Denmark | 5 – 0 (0 – 0, 3 – 0, 2 – 0) | Great Britain | Piešťany |

| 13 March 1996; 2:30 pm | Netherlands | 1 – 3 (1 – 1, 1 – 2, 0 – 1) | Denmark | Piešťany |

| 13 March 1996; 5:30 pm | Czech Republic | 7 – 1 (1 – 0, 0 – 1, 6 – 0) | Great Britain | Piešťany |

| 15 March 1996; 1:30 pm | Denmark | 5 – 3 (2 – 0, 2 – 1, 1 – 2) | Czech Republic | Trnava |

| 15 March 1996; 4:00 pm | Great Britain | 1 – 7 (1 – 1, 0 – 2, 0 – 4) | Netherlands | Piešťany |

=== Playoff round ===
==== Consolation round 7–8 place ====
| 16 March 1996; 11:00 am | Great Britain | 4 – 5 OT (2 – 1, 1 – 2, 1 – 1, 0 – 1) | Kazakhstan | Trnava |

==== Consolation round 5–6 place ====
| 16 March 1996; 3:00 pm | France | 7 – 3 (3 – 1, 1 – 0, 3 – 2) | Netherlands | Piešťany |

==== Match for third place ====
| 16 March 1996; 2:45 pm | Czech Republic | 5 – 2 (0 – 1, 4 – 1, 1 – 0) | Slovakia | Trnava |

==== Final ====
| 16 March 1996; 6:30 pm | Latvia | 0 – 3 (0 – 2, 0 – 1, 0 – 0) | Denmark | Trnava |

== Final standings ==
| Rk. | Team | Notes |
|---|---|---|
| 1st place, gold medalist(s) | Sweden | Qualified for the 1997 World Championships |
| 2nd place, silver medalist(s) | Russia | Qualified for the 1997 World Championships |
| 3rd place, bronze medalist(s) | Finland | Qualified for the 1997 World Championships |
| 4. | Norway | Qualified for the 1997 World Championships |
| 5. | Switzerland | Qualified for the 1997 World Championships |
| 6. | Germany | Qualified for the 1999 World Championships Qualification Tournament |
| 7. | Denmark | Qualified for the 1999 World Championships Qualification Tournament |
| 8. | Latvia | Qualified for the 1999 World Championships Qualification Tournament |
| 9. | Czech Republic | Qualified for the 1999 World Championships Pre-Qualification Tournament |
| 10. | Slovakia | Qualified for the 1999 World Championships Pre-Qualification Tournament |
| 11. | France | Qualified for the 1999 World Championships Pre-Qualification Tournament |
| 12. | Netherlands | Qualified for the 1999 World Championships Pre-Qualification Tournament |
| 13. | Kazakhstan | Qualified for the 2000 World Championships Pool B Qualification Tournament |
| 14. | Great Britain | Qualified for the 2000 World Championships Pool B Qualification Tournament |

== See also ==
- IIHF European Women Championships
