= Satomi =

- Pronunciation: Sá-tó-mí
- Gender: Female

Origin
- Origin: Japanese
- Meaning: different meanings depending on the kanji used.
- Region of origin: Japan

Other names
- Related names: Satoko

Satomi (さとみ, サトミ) is a feminine Japanese given name which is also a surname.

== Written forms ==
Satomi can be written using different kanji characters and can mean:

- 里美, "hometown, beauty"
- 怜美, "wise, beauty"
- 聡美, "wise, beauty"
- 智美, "wisdom, beauty"
- 理美, "intelligence, beauty"
- 叡美, "intelligence, beauty"
- 聖美, "holy, beauty"

The name can also be written in hiragana or katakana.

- さと美, "sato, (Note: In hiragana.) beauty" (Note: A real person with this name is Satomi Takasugi.)
- サト美, "sato, (Note: In katakana.) beauty"

as a surname

- 里見, "hometown, look"

== Satomi Clan ==
- Satomi clan (里見氏), a Japanese clan originating in the Sengoku period
  - Satomi Yoshihiro (里美 義弘; 1530-1578), a samurai of the Satomi clan
  - Satomi Tadayoshi (里見 忠義; 1594-1622), a retainer of the Okubo clan

== Places ==
- Satomi, Ibaraki (里美村), a town in Ibaraki prefecture

== People ==
=== Given name ===
- Satomi Akesaka (明坂 聡美; born 1988), Japanese actress, voice actress and former singer
- Satomi Amano (天野 聡美), Japanese voice actress
- Satomi Arai (明坂 聡美; born 1980), Japanese voice actress
- Satomi Fukunaga (福永 恵規; born 1967), Japanese former idol and singer
- Satomi Hanamura (花村 怜美; born 1984), Japanese actress and voice actress
- Satomi Hinatsu (日夏 理美; born 1998), Japanese-American voice actress and former showrunner of Battle for Dream Island
- Satomi Ichikawa (市川 里美; born 1949), Japanese children's literature illustrator and author
- Satomi Igawa (井川 里美; born 1978), Japanese former badminton player
- Satomi Ikezawa (池沢 理美; born 1984), Japanese manga artist
- Satomi Ishihara (石原 さとみ; born 1986), Japanese actress
- Satomi Ito (伊藤 聡美; born 1988), Japanese fashion and costume designer
- Satomi Kobayashi (小林 聡美; born 1965), Japanese actress
- Satomi Koike (小池 里美; born 1950), Japanese speed skater
- Satomi Kōrogi (こおろぎ さとみ; born 1962), Japanese actress, voice actress and narrator
- Satomi Kubokura (久保倉 里美; born 1982), Japanese track and field athlete
- Satomi Matsuzaki (born 1974), Japanese member of the Deerhoof
- Satomi Mitarai (怜美), a 12-year-old Japanese schoolgirl who was murdered by her classmate
- Satomi Oka (丘 さとみ; 1935–2024), Japanese actress
- Satomi Okuie (born 1982), Japanese instructor
- Satomi Ono (尾野 聡美; born 1975), Japanese ice hockey player
- Satomi Satō (佐藤 聡美; born 1986), Japanese voice actress and singer
- Satomi Suzuki (鈴木 聡美; born 1991), Japanese swimmer
- Satomi Takano (高野 聡美; born 1990), Japanese mixed martial artist
- Satomi Takasugi (高杉 さと美; born 1985), Japanese pop singer, race queen, and former gravure idol
- Satomi Wadami (和田見 里美; born 1987), Japanese amateur road and track cyclist
- Satomi Watanabe (渡邉 聡美; born 1999), Japanese professional squash player

=== Surname ===
- Ahmad Satomi (born 1981) a member of Nigeria's 9th House of Representatives
- Hajime Satomi (里見 治; born 1942), Japanese businessman and the founder of Sammy Corporation
- Kana Satomi (里見 香奈; born 1992), Japanese women's professional shogi player
- Kōtarō Satomi (里見 浩太朗; born 1936), Japanese actor
- Saki Satomi (里見 咲紀; born 1996), Japanese women's professional shogi player
- Sarina Satomi (里見 紗李奈; born 1998), Japanese para-badminton player
- Susumu Satomi (里見 進; born 1948), Japanese surgeon and academic administrator
- Ryūji Satomi (里見 隆治; born 1967), Japanese politician
- Ton Satomi (里見 弴; 1888-1983), Japanese author
- Yukio Satomi (born 1975), Japanese ice hockey player
- Yuzuki Satomi (里見 柚己; born1997), Japanese kickboxer

=== Pseudonym ===
- DJ Satomi, an Italian electronic music producer and remixer
- Satomi (singer, born 1989) (理美), a Japanese singer
- Satomi (singer, born 1993) (さとみ), a Japanese singer

== Fictional characters ==
- Satomi Hakase (聡美), a character from Negima! Magister Negi Magi
- Satomi Noda (聡美), a character in the film, novel, and manga Battle Royale
- Satomi Ozawa (さとみ), a character in the anime and manga series Shadow Star
- Satomi Yajima (聡美), a character from the 2D fighting game series Variable Geo
- Michiru Satomi (サトミ), a character from the anime series Immortal Grand Prix
- Satomi Ito, (Note: No canonical Japanese name as character in American series.) a powerful Alpha werewolf character and leader of a large werewolf pack on Teen Wolf
- Satomi Usagi (里美), a character from Puella Magi Kazumi Magica, a manga spinoff of Puella Magi Madoka Magica

== See also ==
- Nansō Satomi Hakkenden (南総里見八犬伝), a Japanese 106 volume epic novel by Kyokutei Bakin
  - Satomi Hakkenden (里見八犬伝), a 1983 Japanese film directed by Kinji Fukasaku loosely based on the above
