= Satoko Ito =

Japanese television tarento and caster (born 1967)

- 伊藤 聡子
- Born: 3 July 1967 (age 59); Itoigawa, Niigata, Japan
- Education: Tokyo Woman's Christian University
- Occupation: Announcer
- Years active: 1989–
- Agent: Sankei
- Television: Super Morning (TV Asahi); Sunday Morning (TBS)
- Website: Official profile

Satoko Ito (伊藤 聡子, Itō Satoko; born 3 July 1967) is a Japanese television tarento and news anchor. She is a visiting professor of the Graduate Institute for Entrepreneurial Studies. She is represented by Sankei.

== Biography ==
She was born in Itoigawa, Niigata. She graduated from Niigata High School and Tokyo Woman's Christian University Faculty of Literature English and American literature. She is also from the Graduate Institute for Entrepreneurial Studies. Former announcer Chika Watanabe, belonging to Nagoya Broadcasting Network, was her classmate at Tokyo Women's University.

In 1989, while she was in college, she appeared as a reporter at TBS's Sunday Morning. After working as a broadcaster for widely viewed programs such as Super Morning and Best Time, she studied at Fordham University in New York City for one year in 2002. While serving as a visiting professor at the Graduate School of Business Creation in 2010, she has served as "Ambassador of Itoigawa Geopark" together with members of the MEXT "Committee on Research and Development in Nuclear Power" committee, Shunichi Kawai and Masaru Nagai. In addition to this, she also appeared at lectures and symposia.

== Current appearance programmes ==
Title	Network	Notes
Dodesuka!	NBN	Saturday commentator
Hiruobi!	TBS	Wednesday commentator
Week Up! Plus	YTV	Commentator
Satoko Ito no Grace Night	Radio Nippon	
Ana Shōchū Club	Foodies-TV	
Hito Sumai Mirai Uruoi no Owner's Life	BS Asahi	
Satoko Ito to Niigata no Keiei-sha	FM Kento	

== Former appearances ==
Run	Title	Network	Notes
	Asa wa Vitamin	TX	Thursday reporter
	Super Morning	EX	
	Sunday Morning	TBS	
10 Apr 2000 – 30 Mar 2001	Best Time	TBS	
	Battle Talk Radio Access	TBS Radio	
	KeyNote	TX	
	Knight in Night	ABC	
	Ikiki Wide	UX	
	Tokyo in Focus	Tokyo MX	
	Kinyō Special: Arigatō Yutaka Ozaki	NHK Satellite 2	
	Just Japan	tvk Emergency Nationwide Net	
	Yokohama Shōfuku Paradise	Radio Nippon	
	Doyō Special	TX	
	Kokoroji: Hakken! Machi no Genkibito	BS-TBS	
	Otona no Europe-gai aruki	BS Nippon, Tabi Channel	
	Tetsuya Takeda no Shūkan Tetsu-gaku	Asahi New Star	

== Advertisement appearances ==
Product	Role
Alico Japan	Caster in advert
