= Satoko =

- Gender: female

Origin
- Origin: Japanese
- Meaning: It can have many different meanings depending on the kanji used.
- Region of origin: Japan

Other names
- Related names: Satomi

Satoko (さとこ, サトコ) is a Japanese female given name.

== Written forms ==
Satoko can be written using different kanji characters and can mean:

- 聡子 "wise, child"
- 智子 "wisdom, child"
- 理子 "logic, child"
- 悟子 "enlightened, child"
- 怜子 "intelligent, child"
- 恵子 "blessing, child"
- 里子 "village, child"
- 郷子 "hometown, child"
- 佐登子 "help, climb, child"

The name can also be written in hiragana or katakana.

== People ==
- Princess Satoko, daughter of Prince Kaya Kuninori
- Satoko, wife of Tokugawa Hidetada, the second Tokugawa shōgun of Japan
- Satoko Akiyama (秋山 紗登子), Japanese popular music artist
- Satoko Anekōji, a lady-in-waiting at the court of Emperor Kōkaku
- Satoko Fujii (藤井 郷子; born 1958), Japanese avant-garde jazz pianist, accordionist and composer
- Satoko Fujiwara (藤原 佐登子; born 1963), Japanese retired para table tennis player
- Satoko Inoue (井上 郷子; born 1958), Japanese pianist
- Satoko Ishimine (石嶺 聡子; born 1975), Japanese female singer-songwriter
- Satoko Ito (伊藤 聡子; born 1967), Japanese television tarento and news anchor
- Satoko Kamoshida (鴨志田 聡子), born 1979, a Yiddish Scholar at the University of Tokyo
- Satoko Kashikawa, producer of 1 Litre of Tears
- Satoko Kishimoto (岸本 聡子; born 1974), Japanese politician and book editor
- Satoko Kitahara (北原 怜子; 1929–1958), Japanese Roman Catholic
- Satoko Kiyuduki (きゆづき さとこ), Japanese manga artist and illustrator
- Satoko Kizaki (木崎 さと子; born 1939), Japanese novelist
- Satoko Kuni, daughter of Prince Kuni Kuniyoshi and sister of Empress Kōjun, the mother of Akihito
- Satoko Kuroki (born 1986), Japanese handball player
- Satoko Mabuchi (馬渕 智子; born 1982), Japanese softball player
- Satoko Makishi (真喜志 智子; born 1977), Japanese pop/folk rock singer
- Satoko Miyachi, character designer for Madlax
- Satoko Miyahara (宮原 知子; born 1998), Japanese retired figure skater
- Satoko Morikawa, character designer for The Cat Returns
- Satoko Morishita (森下 恵子; born 1974), Japanese former backstroke swimmer
- Satoko Nishikawa, singer of Shang Shang Typhoon
- Satoko Okazaki (岡崎 聡子; born 1961), Japanese gymnast
- Satoko Okudera (奥寺 佐渡子; born 1966), Japanese screenwriter
- Satoko Sakamoto, murdered by members of Aum Shinrikyo along with her husband, Tsutsumi Sakamoto, who was a lawyer working on a class action lawsuit against Aum Shinrikyo, and her child
- Satoko Shimonari (下成 佐登子; born 1961), Japanese singer and occasional actress
- Satoko Shinashi (しなし さとこ; born 1977), Japanese mixed martial artist
- Satoko Shinohara (篠原 聡子; born 1958), Japanese architect, architectural educator, and architectural researcher
- Satoko Suetsuna (末綱 聡子; born 1981), Japanese badminton player
- Satoko Suzuki, Japanese diplomat
- Satoko Takita, chairwoman of Mozilla Japan
- Satoko Tanaka (田中 聡子; born 1942), Japanese retired backstroke swimmer
- Satoko Togano (戸叶 里子; 1908–1971), Japanese politician
- Satoko Tsushima (津島 里子; 1947–2016), Japanese fiction writer, essayist and critic
- Satoko Yamada (山田 聡子; born 1995), Japanese sports shooter
- Satoko Yamano (山野 さと子; born 1963), Japanese voice actress and singer

== Fictional characters ==
- Satoko Yamano from Oh My Goddess!
- Satoko Ayakura from The Sea of Fertility
- Satoko Hōjō from Higurashi When They Cry
- A character from The Sound of the Mountain
- Satoko Shimoyanagi from Churasan 3
- Asai Satoko from Friends (2002 TV series)
- A character from Strawberry Shortcakes
- Satoko Takanashi from Gate Keepers
- Satoko Kayama, a minor character in the Paranoia Agent episode "Mellow Maromi"
- When Ash was crossdressed in Pokémon, Ash (Satoshi) was called 'Satoko (Ashley)'
- Satoko Sasauchi, a character from Strike Witches
- Satoko Kusagakure from NinKoro
