= Fortkord =

Fortkord is a surname. Notable people with the surname include:

- Fredrik Fortkord (born 1979), Swedish freestyle skier
- Martina Fortkord (born 1973), Swedish alpine skier
