= Tamao Akae =

Japanese announcer (born 1975)

- 赤江 珠緒
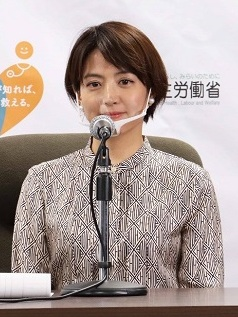
- Akae in 2020
- Born: 9 January 1975 (age 51); Akashi, Hyōgo, Japan
- Other names: Tama-chan; Tamappu; Akae-kun (赤江君); Chantama (ちゃんたま); Tāchan (たーちゃん)
- Education: Kobe College Human Science Department
- Years active: 1997– present
- Agent: Freelance
- Known for: Former Asahi Broadcasting Corporation announcer
- Television: Browse list
- Spouse: Undisclosed (m. 2008)
- Children: 1

Tamao Akae (赤江 珠緒, Akae Tamao; born 9 January 1975), is a Japanese freelance announcer, chairperson, and radio personality. She is a former Asahi Broadcasting Corporation announcer. Currently she is a freelancer.

== Career ==
=== Early life ===
She was from Akashi, Hyōgo. She has a sister and brother. She experienced living in Kōchi, Kōchi up to six years old. Yosuke Tagawa was her first love. She graduated from Akashi-shi Uozumi Middle School, Hyogo Prefectural Government High School, and Kobe College Human Science Department. She had the experience of being a Sun TV Girl in her college days. Kansai Telecasting Corporation announcer Natsumi Sugimoto is a classmate of her college age.

=== Joining Asahi Broadcasting Corporation (ABC) ===
She joined in 1997. Her nicknames are "Tama-chan" (タマちゃん) and "Tamappu" (たまっぷ) (the title of the number that had previously appeared in the Kansai is fixed as a nickname). She synchronised with Naoko Takano and Yuko Hashizume.

She was a live female announcer relaying the live broadcast of the 1998 National High School Baseball Tournament Championship (the second relay after television relaying to Tomomi Sekine, the Akae is the first radio broadcast).

Her catch phrase Gokigen! Burannyu is "to grab a microphone and work with your mouth".

In a rumour that she was ignorant at 5-Ji ni Muchū! and she was ignoring the call of Etsuko Komiya at the Asahi Broadcasting Corporation era, she was awaiting the manuscript thought that she appeared in the last person but she ignored the manuscript because she was called at the beginning and she had no manuscript and she ignored the rumour it was.

=== Transfer to Tokyo ===
Since 30 June 2003, she was in charge of moderating TV Asahi's Super Morning, she was transferred to the Tokyo branch office (concurrently serving as the organisational department announcement department and the Tokyo branch organisation department).

Since entering in 2005, ABC's own work such as Geinōjin Kakuzuke Check! (Ninki-sha de ikou! in the programme reconstruction period "revival special number), Futari wa Pretty Cure (movie version guest voice actor) also works in addition, she also served as a local caster in Montreal, where the TV Asahi relayed nationwide "FINA World Aquatics Championships 2005" venue.

=== Back to Osaka ===
On 31 March 2006, she exchanged Super Morning and replaced to TV Asahi announcer Maki Nomura. After that, she returned to ABC head office and returned to assistance as Ohayō Asahi Doyōbi desu which was appeared as assistant from 6 May 2006 on behalf of Wakako Takeda who got down for birth for the first time in three and a half years.

On 5 August 2006, VTR appeared in comments on Yuko Kotera who appeared beyond the station's fence as representative at Kansai 5 Bureau Female Announcer SP of Kansai TV's Nanbo De Nanbo.

Once she came back to the announcer who worked at ABC head office, from October 2006 she was decided to be appointed as a caster (successor of Kayoko Miyata) of the TV Asahi-ABC co-production programme Sunday Project again, nationwide online she began regular appearances on programmes of. Meanwhile, she continued appearances to Ohayō Asahi Doyōbi desu, while regularly appearing in the Osaka quasi-key station, she regularly appeared on live programmes of both Kanto and Kansai stations.

=== Freelance turn ===
She left ABC on 31 March 2007 and turned to freelance, and in April she returned to the host of Super Morning on weekday mornings. For that reason, she dropped off the regular programmes that she had (excluding Sunday Project, Geinōjin Kakuzuke Check!, etc.) and the activity base also moved to Tokyo. After free turnover, instead of belonging to the entertainment office, Akae herself established a private office and acts as a window herself. On 23 September, as a lifeline (telephone) of Soichiro Tahara who participated as a solver in the special edition of Fuji Television's Quiz $ Millionaire, she played the first appearance of a programme other than TV Asahi series while making a video call.

In 2009 and 2010, she served as a sub-caster of the election special programme Senkyo Station of TV Asahi at the day of the national election campaign. Super Morning which Akae served as the host on 1 April 2011 celebrated the final round, but "Jōhō Mansai Live Show: Morning Bird!" of the successor programme which started broadcasting from 4 April after 3 days at that time, along with Shinichi Hatori, who was immediately after the freelance turnover, served as a general moderator. On 2 April 2012, she also served personality of TBS Radio's Tamao Akae: Tama Musubi (Mondays to Thursdays). In November 2013, she was appointed as a caller to the opposition statement by television caster, journalists and others against the State Secrecy Law that was being discussed at the National Assembly.

She tried the full marathon for the first time at the Kobe Marathon on 23 November 2014, and finished in 4 hours 59 minutes 12 seconds time. Although it was a shortcut for many years, since about spring of 2014, she began to stretch hair "to stop the hat worn by the marathon practice at the breeze, with hair tied up". In November 2014 it was a semi-long to the shoulder (since she never had been hanging down afterwards, it is unknown how long she extended it to length). However, in April 2015 she returned her hair to a short cut because she "can not lean back on the seat back". It is just after renewing the advertisement photograph of Morning Bird! to long hair one.

She is a fan of NHK's Asadora. Since the Asadora main broadcast is a counterprogramme of Super Morning, and later Morning Bird, she was talking that she was watching with a re-air of daytime, during the morning wide-screen show. Since 12 April 2015, she served on Tokyo Broadcasting System's Kono Sa Ttenandesuka?, and became her first regular programme on television other than ANN affiliates. On 25 September 2015, she made her final appearance in Morning Bird!

== Private life ==
On 23 November 2008, she submitted a marriage notification with the director of the TV Asahi Press Office, who is three years older, and got married and announced in the Super Morning broadcast on the 27th of the same month. In May 2009, they went to their wedding reception.

On 16 February 2017, Tokyo Broadcasting System's Tamao Akae: Tama Musubi live broadcast reported her first child pregnancy. On the same year of 30 March, she stepped down from Tamao Akae: Tama Musubi, and entered maternity leave. On 27 July, she gave birth to her first child girl. She made a call appearance on Tama Musubi for the first time after birth on 22 August 2017. At that time, she was told that delivery was difficult due to two days of hardship, the course of postpartum etc. was told from Akae.

Some of her fans called her Fashion Monster because her taste in clothes are unusual.

== Former appearances ==
=== Television ===
(*) denotes All-Nippon News Network series nationwide net

==== ABC announcer era ====
- Shūkan Wide ABCDE-su
- ABC News You
- Gokigen! Burannyu – Even now, she made a guest appearance once a year in some cases.
- Super Morning (*(Including out of line), Jun 2003 – Mar 2006)
- Reikan Bus Guide Jikenbo (*, 30 Apr 2004 Episode 3) – as moderator of the wide show
- Fugo Keiji (*) – Masaru Nashimoto won the guest appearance with the host of the wide show
- Geinōjin Kakuzuke Check (*, 2005–12) – as special programme in progress of reorganisation person
- Akashiya Cream Land (*) – as special programme progress person
- ABC Venus Battle (* (some parts))
- Kaoru Aoyama no Golf Michi (sky A)
- Ohayō Asahi Doyōbi desu (Jan 2000 – Mar 2003, May 2006 – 24 Mar 2007)
- Ohayō Asahi Kōshien desu – Broadcast during the Japanese High School Baseball Championship
- Sunday Project (*, Oct 2006 – 30 Sep 2007)

==== After freelance conversion ====
- Shūmatsu no Tanken-ka: Yume Rashinban (Asahi Broadcasting Production Kansai Local) – Akae left ABC, after the free turn, appeared on ABC production local programme for the first time
- Super Morning (Apr 2007 – Apr 2011)
- Quiz $ Millionaire Kisai SP (CX, 23 Sep 2007) – Soichiro Tahara's Telephone Brain
- Hōdō Tokuban: Shisen Daijishin (EX*, 25 May 2008)
- Sanma & Noriyuki Makihara no Sekai ni Hitotsudake no Uta 2 (ABC*, 19 Aug 2008)
- Rettō Ihen 2008: Nippon Nettai-ka no Kyōfu (EX*, 20 Sep 2008)
- Quiz Present Variety: Q-sama!! (EX*, 2 Feb, 4 May, 2 Nov 2009, 22 Feb 2010, 20 Jun 2011)
- Senkyo Station (EX*, 30 Aug 2009, 11 Jul 2010) – Part 1 Sub caster
- Hai! TV Asahi desu (EX, 10 Jan 2010) – Listened to TV Asahi President Hiroshi Hayakawa, Listener
- Jōhō Mansai Live Show: Morning Bird (EX, General moderator) (4 Apr 2011 – 25 Sep 2015)
- Kanjani no Shiwake Eight (EX*, 17 Sep 2011) – Guest
- Glitter Force (ABC*, 25 Mar 2012) – as Tamao Akae (herself)
- All-Star Thanksgiving (TBS)
  - All-Star Thanksgiving '12 Spring Entertainment Industry No.1 Decision Fight SP (31 Mar 2012) – Guest solver
  - All-Star Thanksgiving '15 Fall Competition Survival! Quiz Championship Decision!! (3 Oct 2015) – Guest solver (Appear as the captain of the team "What is This Difference?")
- Chō Saigen! Mystery (NTV, 17 Jul 2012) – Guest
- Doctor-X: Gekai Michiko Daimon (EX*, 15 Nov 2012 Episode 4) – as Mariko Yoshinaga
- Waratte Iitomo! (CX, 30 Aug, 22 Nov 2013, 14 Mar 2014) – The same generation poker classmate 5, Telephone Shocking guest
- Nep League (CX, 19 Oct 2013) – Guest
- Cream Quiz Miracle 9 (EX*, 1 Dec 2013) – Guest
- Pekepon (CX, 21 Feb 2014) – Guest
- Wednesday Downtown (TBS, 9 Jul 2014) – Guest
- EyeSight presents Koisuru Drive (BS Asahi, 9, 16 Jul 2014) – Guest
- Minor Gyōkai News 'The Highlight' (NTV, 19 Oct 2014) – Main caster
- Supanichi! "Great Regret Age Learning from Failure TV" (TBS, 1 Nov 2014) – Moderator
- BS Asahi Shinshun Tōron Special: Dai Teigen!: Ashita wa Dō naru Sengo 70-nen no Kiro: Ima Nihon o Kangaeru 2015 (BS Asahi, 1 Jan 2015) – Moderator
- Takeshi no Nippon no Mikata! (TX, 13 Feb, 10 Apr 2015) – Guest
- Kono Sa Ttenandesuka? (TBS, Moderator) (12 Apr 2015 – 21 Mar 2017)
- Wide na Show (CX, 17 Jan 2016 and others) – Commentator
- Chimata no Hanashi (TX, 19 Jan 2016) – Guest
- Tsuchi Chare "Quiz Hasister!" (CX, 18 Jun 2016) – Solver
- Tamori Club (EX, 1 Oct 2016) – Guest
- Sekai no Nihonjin Tsuma wa Mita! (MBS, 8 Nov 2016) – Guest
- 5-Ji ni Muchū! (MXTV, 25 Apr 2017) – Guest
- Beat Takeshi no Shiranai News (EX, 7 May 2017) – Guest
- Yamasato & Matsuko Deluxe (TBS, 17 Apr, 24 April 2018) – Guest
- Bokura no Jidai (CX, 19 Aug 2018) – Guest
- Stories to Match (NTV 10 Apr 2019) – Guest
- Kanjani Eight Chronicle '19 Midsummer 100 minutes Special: Super difficult problem! Katahira and IKKO Ingredients Guess (CX, 14 Aug 2019) – Guest
- Miracle! Counseling: Sekai no kenja ga Nihon o sukuu!? (NHK, 16 Sep 2019) – Guest
- Miyane-ya (YTV, 29 Jul 2020)
- NHK Special: Reiwa Future Conference "How to deal with the anxiety of the new corona?" (NHK, 11 Oct 2020) – Commentator
- Mokugeki! Nippon: “Bakusō oyaji” egao o todokete (NHK, 20 Jun 2021) – Narrator

=== Radio ===
==== ABC announcer era ====
- Tommy's no Tonton! (ABC Radio, Oct 2006 – 24 Mar 2007 Saturdays 19:00–19:30)

==== After freelance conversion ====
- Fumio Takada no Radio Beverly Hiru-zu (NBS, 19 Jun 2007) – Sppeared as a substitute for Tuesday regular announcer Minori Masuda
- Takashi Uehara no All Night Nippon: Supporters (NBS, 21 Oct 2007 25:00–25:30) – Guest appearance
- Driver's Request (TBS Radio and others JRN System Nationwide net, 2 Apr 2012 – 31 Dec 2014 Weekdays)
- Akao Tamae: Tama Musubi (TBS Radio, Mondays–Thursdays, Personality) (2 Apr 2012 – 30 Mar 2017)
- Bakushō Mondai no Nichiyō Sunday (TBS Radio, 15 Dec 2013 13:00–17:00) – Guest appearance
- Naruyoshi Kikuchi no Ikina Yoru Denpa (TBS Radio, 23 Feb 2014 19:00–19:57) – Guest appearance
- Jane Sue Sōdan wa Odoru (TBS Radio, 19 Dec 2015 19:00–21:00) – Substitution MC
- ABC Radio Setsuritsu Kinen Tokubetsu Bangumi: Radio wa Aida!? (ABC Radio, 27 May 2018 19:00–21:00)
- Be Style (TBS Radio, 30 January, 6 February 2021) – Guest appearance
- Dokkiri! Hakkiri! It's Yashushi Miyosawa (7 June 2021) – Guest appearance

=== TV dramas ===
- Jūhan Shuttai! Episode 8 (31 May 2016, TBS) – as Shoko Ushiroda

=== Films ===
- Futari wa Pretty Cure Max Heart the Movie (2005, as Heart)
- Pretty Cure All Stars New Stage: Friends of the Future (2012, as Ayumi's mother)

Other

=== Advertisements ===
- Megane no Yamamoto (Sun TV, Around 1995)
- Robata-fū Restauranto Jizōmura Irifune (Sun, Around 1995)
