= 1999 Women's World Ice Hockey Championships Qualification =

The 1999 IIHF Women's World Championship qualification process was contested between 10 teams competing for the three final places in the championships. The other seven teams would join Japan (the 6th Place team from the 1998 Olympic games), in the newly formed Pool B.

== Teams ==
The following is the nations that competed, and the stage at which they entered the qualification process:

At Pre-Qualification (nations ranked 9th through 12th at the last European Championship)

- Czech Republic
- France
- Netherlands
- Slovakia

At Final Qualification (nations ranked above 9th who did compete in the Nagano Olympics)

- Denmark
- Germany
- Latvia
- Norway
- Russia
- Switzerland

== Format ==
The four teams in the Pre-Qualification group would play a single round robin, with the top two proceeding to the Final Qualification.

The eight teams in Final Qualification would be split into two groups of four, with the top two teams automatically qualifying for the World Championship, and a single match playoff at a neutral location to decide the final qualifier.

== Pre-Qualification ==
Teams proceed to Final Qualification
Teams play in 1999 World Championship Pool B

=== Group stage ===
==== Standings ====
Rk.	Team	GP	W	T	L	GF	GA	DIF	PTS
1.	Czech Republic	3	3	0	0	17	6	+11	6
2.	France	3	2	0	1	12	6	+6	4
3.	Slovakia	3	1	0	2	7	10	-3	2
4.	Netherlands	3	0	0	3	3	17	-14	0

Czech Republic and France advanced to the Final Qualification. Slovakia and Netherlands qualified for Pool B.

==== Results ====
January 27, 1998	Czech Republic	6 – 2	Netherlands	Colmar

January 27, 1998	France	3 – 1	Slovakia	Colmar

January 28, 1998	Slovakia	2 – 7	Czech Republic	Colmar

January 28, 1998	Netherlands	1 – 7	France	Colmar

January 29, 1998	Netherlands	0 – 4	Slovakia	Colmar

January 29, 1998	Czech Republic	4 – 2 (1:0, 3:0, 0:2)	France	Colmar

== Final Qualification ==
Team qualified for 1999 World Championship.
Teams advanced to final Playoff
Teams qualified for 1999 World Championship Pool B

=== Group A ===
==== Standings ====
Rk.	Team	GP	W	T	L	GF	GA	DIF	PTS
1.	Germany	3	3	0	0	26	1	+25	6
2.	Russia	3	2	0	1	18	7	+11	4
3.	France	3	1	0	2	3	25	-22	2
4.	Denmark	3	0	0	3	3	17	-14	0

Germany qualifies for the World Championship. Russia advances to the Final Playoff. France and Denmark qualified for Pool B.

==== Results ====
March 23, 1998	Russia	14 – 1	France	Füssen

March 23, 1998	Denmark	0 – 12	Germany	Füssen

March 24, 1998	Denmark	1 – 2	France	Füssen

March 24, 1998	Germany	4 – 1	Russia	Füssen

March 25, 1998	Russia	3 – 2	Denmark	Füssen

March 25, 1998	France	0 – 10	Germany	Füssen

=== Group B ===
==== Standings ====
Rk.	Team	GP	W	T	L	GF	GA	DIF	PTS
1.	Switzerland	3	3	0	0	16	2	+14	6
2.	Norway	3	1	1	1	9	9	+0	4
3.	Czech Republic	3	1	1	1	4	6	-2	2
4.	Latvia	3	0	0	3	2	14	-12	0

Suitzerland qualifies for the World Championship. Norway advances to the Final Playoff. Czech Republic and Latvia qualified for Pool B.

==== Results ====
March 23, 1998	Norway	6 – 0	Latvia	Huttwil

March 23, 1998	Switzerland	3 – 0	Czech Republic	Huttwil

March 24, 1998	Norway	2 – 2	Czech Republic	Huttwil

March 24, 1998	Latvia	1 – 6	Switzerland	Huttwil

March 25, 1998	Czech Republic	2 – 1	Latvia	Huttwil

March 25, 1998	Switzerland	7 – 1	Norway	Huttwil

== Final Playoff ==
The final playoff was held two days after the main tournaments were finished in the town of Zuchwil in Switzerland

March 27, 1998	Russia	6 – 1 (1 - 0, 4 - 1, 1 - 0)	Norway	Zuchwil

Russia qualifies for the World Championship. Norway qualifies for Pool B.

== Final standings ==
Rk.	Team	Notes
1.	Germany	Qualified to the 1999 World Championships as Qualifier 1
2.	Switzerland	Qualified to the 1999 World Championships as Qualifier 2
3.	Russia	Qualified to the 1999 World Championships as Qualifier 3
4.	Norway	Qualified for 1999 World Championships Pool B
5.	Czech Republic	Qualified for 1999 World Championships Pool B
6.	France	Qualified for 1999 World Championships Pool B
7.	Latvia	Qualified for 1999 World Championships Pool B
8.	Denmark	Qualified for 1999 World Championships Pool B
9.	Slovakia	Qualified for 1999 World Championships Pool B
10.	Netherlands	Qualified for 1999 World Championships Pool B
