= Marja-Helena Pälvilä =

Finnish ice hockey player (born 1970)

- Born: 4 March 1970 (age 56) Oulu, Finland
- Height: 176 cm (5 ft 9 in)
- Weight: 70 kg (154 lb; 11 st 0 lb)
- Position: Defence
- Shot: Left
- Played for: JoKP Joensuu; Keravan Shakers; Kiekko-Karhut; Espoo Blues; Oulun Kärpät
- National team: Finland
- Playing career: 1992–2013
Medal record
Women's ice hockey
Representing Finland
Olympic Games
Bronze medal – third place	1998 Nagano	Ice hockey
World Championship
Bronze medal – third place	1997 Canada
Bronze medal – third place	2000 Canada
European Championship
Bronze medal – third place	1996 Russia

Marja-Helena Pälvilä (born 4 March 1970) is a Finnish retired ice hockey player. She was a member of the Finnish women's national ice hockey team throughout the 1990s and 2000s and won a bronze medal at the inaugural Olympic women's ice hockey tournament at the 1998 Winter Olympics. Pälvilä also represented Finland in the women’s ice hockey tournaments at the 2002 and 2006 Winter Olympics, and won bronze medals at the IIHF Women's World Championships in 1997 and 2000, and at the 1996 IIHF European Women Championships.
