= Satomi Okuie =

Japanese karateka

- Born: 21 March 1982; Aomori Prefecture, Japan
- Style: Shotokan Karate
- Teacher(s): Masaaki Ueki
- Rank: 3rd Dan karate (JKA)

Satomi Okuie (Okuie Satomi, 21 March 1982) is a Japanese instructor of Shotokan karate.

She is currently an instructor of the Japan Karate Association.

== Biography ==
Satomi Okuie was born in Aomori Prefecture, Japan on 21 March 1982. She studied at Komazawa University. Her karate training began during her Age 4.

== Competition ==
Satomi Okuie has had considerable success in karate competition.

=== Major Tournament Success ===
- 53rd JKA All Japan Karate Championship (2010) - 3rd Place Women's Kumite
- 52nd JKA All Japan Karate Championship (2009) - 1st Place Women's Kumite
- 51st JKA All Japan Karate Championship (2008) - 1st Place Women's Kumite
- 50th JKA All Japan Karate Championship (2007) - 1st Place Women's Kumite
- 49th JKA All Japan Karate Championship (2006) - 3rd Place Women's Kumite
- 48th JKA All Japan Karate Championship (2005) - 1st Place Women's Kumite
- 9th Shoto World Cup Karate Championship Tournament (Tokyo, 2004) - 1st Place Women's Kumite
- 47th JKA All Japan Karate Championship (2004) - 3rd Place Women's Kumite
- 46th JKA All Japan Karate Championship (2003) - 2nd Place Women's Kumite
- 45th JKA All Japan Karate Championship (2002) - 3rd Place Women's Kumite
- 44th JKA All Japan Karate Championship (2001) - 3rd Place Women's Kumite
- 43rd JKA All Japan Karate Championship (2000) - 2nd Place Women's Kumite
