= Anders Söderberg (luger) =

Swedish luger (born 1971)

Personal information
- Nationality: Swedish
- Born: 8 July 1971 (age 53); Stockholm, Sweden

Sport
- Sport: Luge

Anders Söderberg (born 8 July 1971) is a Swedish luger. He competed at the 1994 Winter Olympics, the 1998 Winter Olympics and the 2002 Winter Olympics.
