= Eva-Karin Westin =

Swedish biathlete (born 1972)

Personal information
- Nationality: Swedish
- Born: 24 June 1972 (age 52)

Sport
- Sport: Biathlon

Eva-Karin Westin (born 24 June 1972) is a Swedish biathlete. She competed at both the 1994 Winter Olympics and the 1998 Winter Olympics.
