= Super Morning =

- Theme music composer: Ikuko Kawai
- Country of origin: Japan
- Original language: Japanese

Production
- Running time: 115 minutes

Original release
- Network: TV Asahi
- Release: 5 April 1993 – March 2011

Related
- The Morning Show (1965–1993)

Super Morning (スーパーモーニング) is a weekday morning news program airing on TV Asahi, a television station in Japan. It was first broadcast on 5 April 1993, and currently airs from 08:00 to 09:55 Mondays to Fridays.

== Presenters ==
=== Main presenters ===
- Ippei Ogi
- Tamao Akae
- Ryota Sasaki (News Tempo Up)
- Nanako Uemiya

=== Regular commentators ===
- Shuntaro Torigoe

== Network ==
- TV Asahi and All-Nippon News Network stations
- YBS
- KNB
- FBC
- JRT
- RKC
