= Graduate Institute for Entrepreneurial Studies =

Private university in Japan

Coordinates: 37.907986°N 139.061896°E

Graduate Institute for Entrepreneurial Studies (事業創造大学院大学, Jigyō sōzō daigakuin daigaku) is a private university (for graduate studies) in Niigata, Niigata, Japan, with branch campuses in Tokyo and in Nagaoka, Niigata. It was established in 2006. The name was changed to "Kaishi Innovation University" (開志創造大学) in April 2026, following the establishment of the Faculty of Information Design. The enrollment capacity is 800 students per grade.
