= Kristina Brounéus =

Swedish biathlete (born 1974)

Personal information
- Nationality: Swedish
- Born: 25 November 1974 (age 50)

Sport
- Sport: Biathlon

Kristina Brounéus (born 25 November 1974) is a Swedish biathlete. She competed in the three events at the 1998 Winter Olympics.
