= Fredrik Kuoppa =

Swedish biathlete (born 1971)

Personal information
- Nationality: Swedish
- Born: 16 August 1971 (age 53); Sundsvall, Sweden

Sport
- Sport: Biathlon

Fredrik Kuoppa (born 16 August 1971) is a Swedish biathlete. He competed in the men's 20 km individual event at the 1998 Winter Olympics.
