= Maria Schylander =

Swedish biathlete (born 1973)

Personal information
- Nationality: Swedish
- Born: 19 May 1973 (age 51)

Sport
- Sport: Biathlon

Maria Schylander (born 19 May 1973) is a Swedish biathlete. She competed at the 1994 Winter Olympics and the 1998 Winter Olympics.
