= Yukari Ohno =

Japanese ice hockey player

Personal information
- Nationality: Japanese
- Born: 10 August 1975 (age 49); Tokyo, Japan

Sport
- Sport: Ice hockey

Yukari Ohno (大野 ゆかり, Ōno Yukari, born 10 August 1975) is a Japanese ice hockey player. She competed in the women's tournament at the 1998 Winter Olympics.
