= Martina Fortkord =

Swedish alpine skier (born 1973)

Martina Fortkord (born 22 March 1973 in Stockholm) is a Swedish former alpine skier who competed in the 1998 Winter Olympics.

Her brother is Olympian Fredrik Fortkord.
