= Pia Morelius =

Swedish ice hockey defender

- Born: 31 March 1966 (age 59) Stockholm, Sweden
- Height: 163 cm (5 ft 4 in)
- Position: Defender
- Shot: Left
- Played for: FOC Farsta; Södertälje SK
- National team: Sweden
- Playing career: 1989–1998

Pia Morelius (born 31 March 1966) is a Swedish ice hockey player.

== Career ==
Morelius began her career with Södertälje, before transferring to FoC Farsta. She played in the inaugural IIHF Women's World Championship in 1990, and would appear again at the World Champhionships in 1992, 1994, and 1997. She also competed in the women's tournament at the 1998 Winter Olympics.

She would retire from international hockey after the Olympics.
