= Linda Gustafsson =

Swedish ice hockey player

Personal information
- Nationality: Swedish
- Born: 20 February 1974 (age 51) Umeå, Sweden

Sport
- Sport: Ice hockey

Linda Gustafsson (born 20 February 1974) is a Swedish ice hockey player. She competed in the women's tournament at the 1998 Winter Olympics.
