= FOC Farsta =

Swedish football club

- Short name: FOC
- Founded: 1977
- Ground: Farsta IP; Farsta; Stockholm; Sweden
- Capacity: 1,000
- Coach: Ahmed Riahi
- League: Division 2 Södra Svealand
- 2020: Division 2 Södra Svealand
Home colours	Away colours

FOC Farsta is a Swedish sports club located in the Farsta district of Stockholm, Sweden.

== Background ==
The club was founded on 1 November 1977 through the merger of Farsta AIK and IF Cobran, hence the abbreviation FoC for “Farsta och Cobran.“ The club provides for bandy, bowling, football and ice hockey. The club's representative women's ice hockey were the Swedish Champions in 1995 and 1997.

Since their foundation, FOC Farsta's men's representative football team has participated mainly in the lower divisions of the Swedish football league system before gaining promotion to Division 2 at the end of the 2009 season. The club currently plays in Division 2 Södra Svealand which is the fourth tier of Swedish football. They play their home matches at the Farsta IP in Farsta.

The club is affiliated to the Stockholms Fotbollförbund.

In 2019, the departments of FoC Farsta were split into three separate associations: the football department took the name FOC Farsta Fotbollsförening (FOC Farsta FF), the hockey department became FOC Farsta Ishockeyförening (FOC Farsta IF), and the bowling department became the Farsta Bowlingklubb.

== Season to season ==
Season	Level	Division	Section	Position	Movements
1993	Tier 4	Division 3	Östra Svealand	11th	Relegated
1994	Tier 5	Division 4	Stockholm Södra	4th	
1995	Tier 5	Division 4	Stockholm Södra	4th	
1996	Tier 5	Division 4	Stockholm Södra	1st	Promoted
1997	Tier 4	Division 3	Östra Svealand	3rd	
1998	Tier 4	Division 3	Östra Svealand	4th	
1999	Tier 4	Division 3	Östra Svealand	6th	
2000	Tier 4	Division 3	Östra Svealand	7th	
2001	Tier 4	Division 3	Östra Svealand	11th	Relegated
2002	Tier 5	Division 4	Stockholm Södra	4th	
2003	Tier 5	Division 4	Stockholm Södra	2nd	Promotion Playoffs
2004	Tier 5	Division 4	Stockholm Södra	5th	
2005	Tier 5	Division 4	Stockholm Södra	2nd	Playoffs
2006*	Tier 5	Division 3	Östra Svealand	8th	
2007	Tier 5	Division 3	Östra Svealand	6th	
2008	Tier 5	Division 3	Södra Svealand	4th	
2009	Tier 5	Division 3	Södra Svealand	1st	Promoted
2010	Tier 4	Division 2	Södra Svealand	4th	
2011	Tier 4	Division 2	Södra Svealand	2nd	demoted
2012	Tier 5	Division 3	Södra Svealand	12th	relegated

* League restructuring in 2006 resulted in a new division being created at Tier 3 and subsequent divisions dropping a level.
