= Satomi Ono =

Japanese ice hockey player

Personal information
- Nationality: Japanese
- Born: 18 November 1975 (age 49); Hokkaido, Japan

Sport
- Sport: Ice hockey

Satomi Ono (尾野 聡美, Ono Satomi, born 18 November 1975) is a Japanese ice hockey player. She competed in the women's tournament at the 1998 Winter Olympics.
