= Susanne Ceder =

Swedish ice hockey player

- Born: 30 June 1967 (age 59) Örnsköldsvik, Sweden
- Height: 167 cm (5 ft 6 in)
- Weight: 64 kg (141 lb; 10 st 1 lb)
- Position: Forward
- Shot: Left
- Played for: Keravan Shakers; Kiekko-Espoo; Espoo Blues
- National team: Sweden
- Playing career: 1988–2000
Medal record
IIHF European Women Championships
Gold medal – first place	1996 Russia
Silver medal – second place	1993 Denmark
Silver medal – second place	1991 Czechoslovakia
Silver medal – second place	1989 West Germany

Susanne Ceder (born 30 June 1967) is a Swedish retired ice hockey player. She played with the Swedish national team from the beginning of women's international ice hockey competition in 1988 until her retirement in 2000. With the team she played in four IIHF European Women Championships (where she won gold in 1996 and silver in 1989, 1991, and 1993) and five IIHF World Women's Championships, placing 4th four times. She served as team captain at the inaugural women's ice hockey tournament at the 1998 Winter Olympic Games.
