= Yukio Satomi =

Japanese ice hockey player

Personal information
- Nationality: Japanese
- Born: 22 October 1975 (age 50) Sapporo, Hokkaido, Japan

Sport
- Sport: Ice hockey

Yukio Satomi (born 22 October 1975) is a Japanese ice hockey player. She competed in the women's tournament at the 1998 Winter Olympics.
