= Tina Månsson =

Swedish ice hockey player (born 1968)

Personal information
- Nationality: Swedish
- Born: 22 April 1968 (age 57) Mariefred, Sweden

Sport
- Sport: Ice hockey

Tina Månsson (born 22 April 1968) is a Swedish ice hockey player. She competed in the women's tournament at the 1998 Winter Olympics.
