= Åsa Elfving =

Swedish ice hockey player

- Born: 1 February 1970 (age 55); Umeå, Sweden
- Height: 173 cm (5 ft 8 in)
- Position: Forward
- Shot: Left
- Played for: Modo Hockey; Nacka HK
- National team: Sweden
- Playing career: 1989–1998

Åsa Elfving (born 1 February 1970) is a Swedish former ice hockey player for the Swedish national team.

== Career ==
Growing up, Elfving supported Modo Hockey, where she would play youth hockey. She would spend a year on exchange at Northfield Mount Hermon School in the US, where she was able to practice hockey more regularly.

She was named to Team Sweden for the first-ever IHF Women's World Championship in 1990, where she would put up 3 assists in 5 games, including an assist on the first-ever goal scored in the tournament. She would appear again for the country at the IIHF World Women's Championship in 1992, 1994, and 1997.

In 1991, she signed with Nacka HK, as she was studying medicine at the Karolinska Institute. She became noted there for her powerful slapshot. The team would win the national championship 8 times in 9 years during the 1990s.

She captained Sweden in the women's tournament at the 1998 Winter Olympics, as the country finished in 5th. She would only put up 1 point in 5 games.

She would retire after the Olympics, having played a total of 83 for Sweden.

== Post-playing career ==
She would serve as team manager for Sweden in the 2000 IIHF World Women's Championship, as the team finished in fourth. Outside of hockey, she is an orthopedic surgeon, a career she entered after her mother died from leukemia in her last year of high school. She has also served as a team doctor for the Swedish national team.
