= Pernilla Burholm =

Swedish ice hockey player

Personal information
- Nationality: Swedish
- Born: 16 February 1974 (age 51) Härnösand, Sweden

Sport
- Sport: Ice hockey

Pernilla Burholm (born 16 February 1974) is a Swedish ice hockey player. She represented Team Sweden in the women's tournament at the 1998 Winter Olympics.
