= Åsa Lidström =

Swedish ice hockey player

Personal information
- Nationality: Swedish
- Born: 15 August 1968 (age 57) Mullsjö, Sweden

Sport
- Sport: Ice hockey

Åsa Lidström (born 15 August 1968) is a Swedish ice hockey player. She competed in the women's tournament at the 1998 Winter Olympics.
