= Anne Ferm =

Swedish ice hockey player

Personal information
- Nationality: Swedish
- Born: 26 August 1969 (age 56) [Enköping, Sweden

Sport
- Sport: Ice hockey

Anne Ferm (born 26 August 1969) is a Swedish ice hockey player. She represented Team Sweden in the women's tournament at the 1998 Winter Olympics.
