= Brian Ihnačák =

Canadian-born Italian ice hockey player

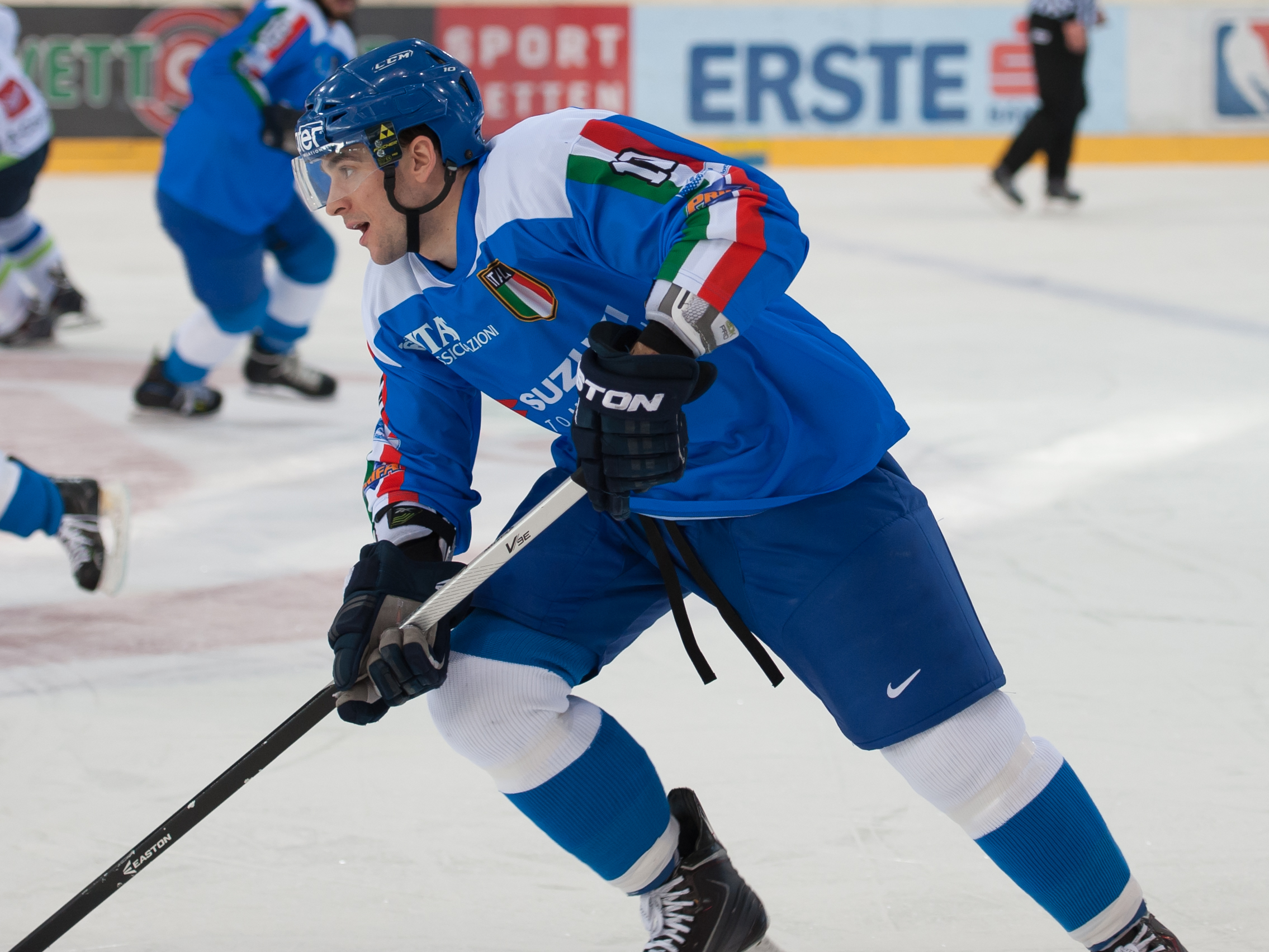
- Born: April 10, 1985 (age 41) Toronto, Ontario, Canada
- Height: 6 ft 0 in (183 cm)
- Weight: 190 lb (86 kg; 13 st 8 lb)
- Position: Centre
- Shot: Right
- Played for: MHK Kežmarok; HKM Zvolen; HK Poprad; SG Pontebba; HC Valpellice; Malmö Redhawks; Vålerenga Ishockey; Mountfield HK; HC Sparta Praha; HC Litvínov; EHC Olten; HC Dynamo Pardubice; HC '05 Banská Bystrica; HC Merano; HC Košice
- National team: Italy
- NHL draft: 259th overall, 2004; Pittsburgh Penguins
- Playing career: 2007–2024

Brian Stephen Ihnacak (born April 10, 1985) is a Canadian-born Italian retired professional ice hockey forward.

== Career ==
Ihnacak was drafted by the Pittsburgh Penguins in the 2004 NHL entry draft, going 259th overall. With the National Hockey League reducing the number of rounds in the NHL entry draft from nine to seven in 2005, Ihnacak currently holds the distinction of being the last Pittsburgh Penguins draft selection to be drafted in the ninth round. The NHL Central Scouting service had Brian ranked 44th overall in North America before the 2004 NHL draft. Ihnacak retired from active hockey in August 2024 at the age of 39. Immediately after retirement, he became a European scout for Pittsburgh Penguins.

== International career ==
Ihnacak competed at the 2014 IIHF World Championship as a member of the Italy men's national ice hockey team.

== Personal ==
Brian's father, Peter Ihnacak, was a former Toronto Maple Leafs draft pick who was selected 34th overall in the 1982 NHL entry draft. His uncle, Miroslav Ihnacak, was also drafted and played for the Maple Leafs. Miroslav later played for the Detroit Red Wings.

== Career statistics ==
=== Regular season and playoffs ===
			Regular season					Playoffs
Season	Team	League	GP	G	A	Pts	PIM	GP	G	A	Pts	PIM
2001–02	St. Michael's Buzzers	OPJHL	48	6	13	19	22	—	—	—	—	—
2002–03	St. Michael's Buzzers	OPJHL	46	40	46	86	66	—	—	—	—	—
2003–04	Brown University	ECAC	31	10	20	30	20	—	—	—	—	—
2004–05	Brown University	ECAC	30	12	11	23	30	—	—	—	—	—
2005–06	Brown University	ECAC	15	3	6	9	31	—	—	—	—	—
2006–07	Brown University	ECAC	27	3	11	14	14	—	—	—	—	—
2007–08	MHK SkiPark Kežmarok	SVK	37	9	10	19	77	—	—	—	—	—
2008–09	Augusta Lynx	ECHL	7	2	0	2	10	—	—	—	—	—
2008–09	Elmira Jackals	ECHL	39	5	8	13	24	—	—	—	—	—
2009–10	MHK SkiPark Kežmarok	SVK.2	2	1	3	4	4	—	—	—	—	—
2009–10	HKm Zvolen	SVK	8	1	1	2	16	—	—	—	—	—
2009–10	HK Aquacity ŠKP Poprad	SVK	2	0	0	0	0	—	—	—	—	—
2010–11	Mississippi RiverKings	CHL	16	2	4	6	8	—	—	—	—	—
2010–11	Texas Brahmas	CHL	20	5	7	12	17	—	—	—	—	—
2010–11	Allen Americans	CHL	6	1	6	7	10	—	—	—	—	—
2011–12	SG Pontebba	ITA	37	13	19	32	60	5	3	7	10	31
2012–13	HC Valpellice	ITA	32	19	23	42	52	16	7	12	19	12
2013–14	HC Valpellice	ITA	36	35	46	81	56	—	—	—	—	—
2013–14	Malmö Redhawks	Allsv	7	3	2	5	4	10	1	1	2	4
2014–15	Vålerenga Ishockey	NOR	44	22	55	77	60	10	0	7	7	8
2015–16	Mountfield HK	ELH	52	17	17	34	46	6	1	6	7	2
2016–17	HC Sparta Praha	ELH	38	11	10	21	55	2	0	0	0	2
2017–18	HC Verva Litvínov	ELH	18	5	7	12	12	—	—	—	—	—
2017–18	EHC Olten	SUI.2	16	9	5	14	10	4	1	2	3	2
2018–19	HC Dynamo Pardubice	ELH	19	5	7	12	43	—	—	—	—	—
2019–20	HC ’05 iClinic Banská Bystrica	SVK	12	5	7	12	6	—	—	—	—	—
2020–21	HC Merano	ITA.2	1	0	2	2	2	—	—	—	—	—
2020–21	HC '05 Banská Bystrica	SVK	21	10	18	28	79	4	1	1	2	4
2021–22	HC '05 Banská Bystrica	SVK	15	3	6	9	18	—	—	—	—	—
2021–22	HC Košice	SVK	16	4	8	12	12	11	5	3	8	10
SVK totals			111	32	50	82	208	15	6	4	10	14
ITA totals			105	67	88	155	168	21	10	19	29	43
ELH totals			127	38	41	79	156	8	1	6	7	4

=== International ===
Year	Team	Event	Result	GP	G	A	Pts	PIM
2014	Italy	WC	15th	7	0	0	0	4
2015	Italy	WC D1A	21st	5	2	2	4	2
Senior totals				12	2	2	4	6

== Awards and honors ==
Award	Year
All-ECAC Hockey Rookie Team	2003–2004
Coppa Italia	2012-2013
Italy most goals Italy most points	2013-2014
Norwegian All-Star Team	2014-2015

Awards and achievements
Preceded by Hugh Jessiman	ECAC Hockey Rookie of the Year; 2003–04 (With David McKee)	Succeeded by Joe Fallon
