= Anthony Aquino =

Canadian-born Italian ice hockey player

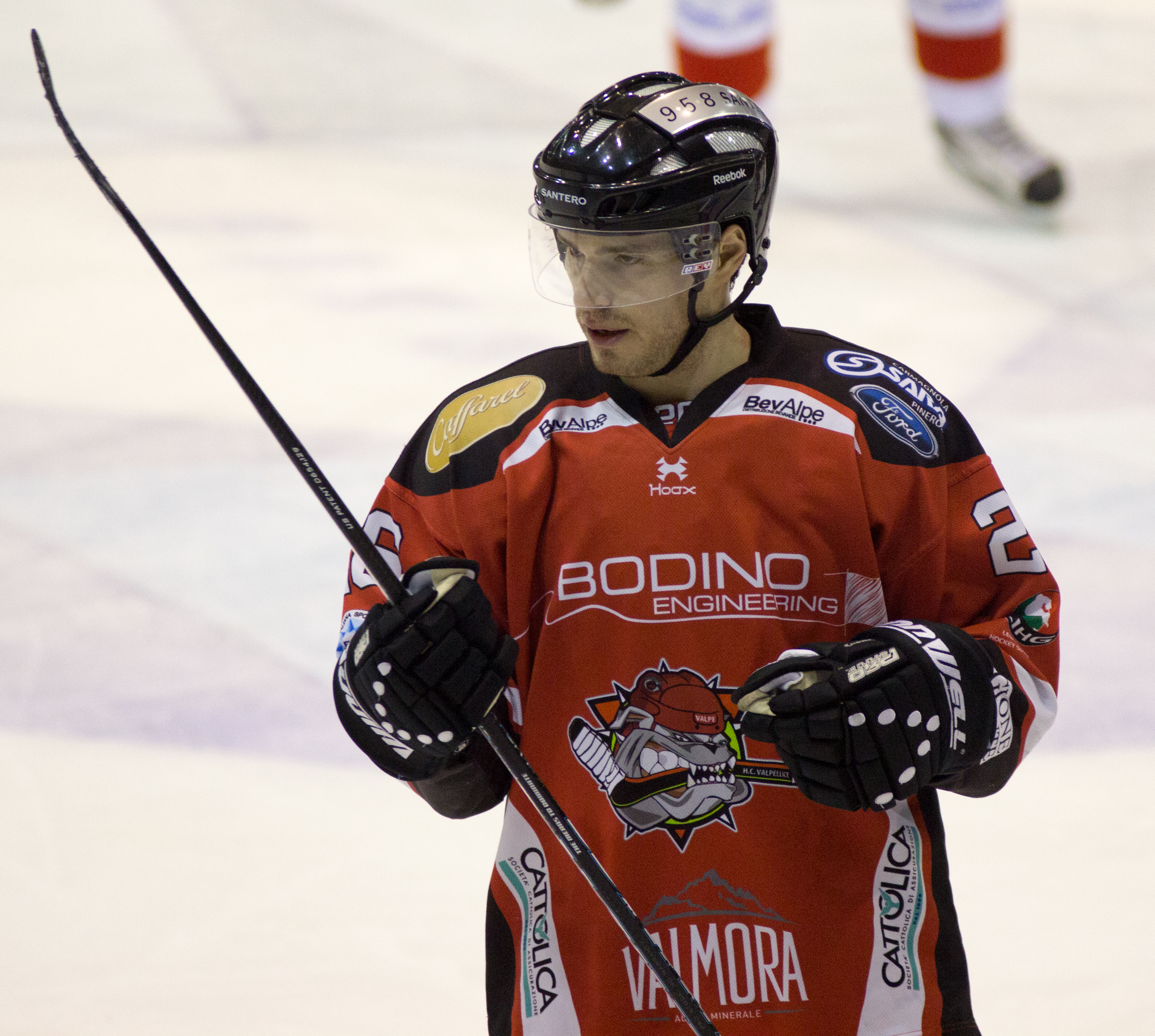
- Anthony Aquino at Coppa Italia 2012-2013
- Born: August 1, 1982 (age 43) Mississauga, Ontario, Canada
- Height: 5 ft 11 in (180 cm)
- Weight: 175 lb (79 kg; 12 st 7 lb)
- Position: Right wing
- Shot: Right
- Played for: Hockey Club Valpellice (Serie A); Sport Ghiaccio Pontebba (Serie A); Brunico SG (Serie A); Arboga IFK (SWE1); Mannheim Eagles (DEL); Sportverein Ritten-Renon (Serie A); Gwinnett Gladiators {ECHL} Chicago Wolves {AHL} Oshawa Generals (OHL); Merrimack Warriors (NCAA); Bramalea Blues (OPJHL); Mississauga Chargers (OPJHL)
- National team: Italy
- NHL draft: 92nd overall, 2001; Dallas Stars
- Playing career: 1997–2016

Anthony Aquino (born August 1, 1982) is a retired Canadian-born Italian professional ice hockey player. He last played for the Odense Bulldogs, and Rungsted Seier Capital professional ice hockey teams in Denmark, of the top Danish league AL-Bank Ligaen, renamed Metalligaen. He was a 3rd round selection, 92nd overall, of the Dallas Stars at the 2001 NHL entry draft.

== Early life ==
Aquino began his early career playing minor hockey with the Toronto Red Wings organization of the Greater Toronto Hockey League. In 1996, they went on to win The World Cup, at The Quebec International Pee-Wee Hockey Tournament.

In 1999 Aquino was drafted round 10 #208 overall by Owen Sound Platers in the Ontario Hockey League (OHL) Priority Draft, but chose not to play in the OHL so as to preserve his American college eligibility. Instead, he spent two seasons playing in the OPJHL, and in 1999 competed in Canada's National Junior A Championship Royal Bank Cup where he was awarded Most Sportsmanlike Player.

== Playing career ==
=== Merrimack College ===
At 17, Aquino attended Merrimack College from 1999 to 2002 on full hockey scholarship. He led the team in goals scored in each of his three seasons at Merrimack. In 110 career games at Merrimack over three seasons, Aquino totaled 115 points on 56 goals and 59 assists.

Aquino was awarded NCAA (Hockey East) All-Rookie Team following his freshman year in 1999–2000. He was awarded NCAA (Hockey East) Second All-Star Team the following two years, as well as NCAA (New England) D1 All-Stars 2001–2002.

He was drafted in the 3rd round of the 2001 NHL entry draft (92nd overall) by the Dallas Stars. Aquino is Merrimack's 2nd highest draft pick of all-time.

In 2002, he was promoted to captain and became the 9th player to ever reach the mark of 100 career points for Merrimack since the program joined Hockey East in 1988. For nine years, Aquino held the record of most points scored over any other Merrimack player, from his 2001–02 season; as well as most points per game average.

Merrimack unveiled the All-Decade Team in 2010, naming Aquino as their leading forward. An all-rookie and all-Hockey East selection, he was the last Warrior to net 40 points until 2010.

=== Professional ===
At Merrimack College, Anthony Aquino was a member of the Hockey East All-Rookie Team as a 17-year-old freshman, a Hockey East Second Team All-Star his sophomore season, and led Merrimack in scoring for the second straight season his junior season. Prior to his senior season, and as senior caption, Aquino received an invitation from the Dallas Stars, who drafted him in the third round in 2001, to participate in both the team's rookie development camp and full-squad training camp on a tryout basis, he decided to accept looking to join the team or play with Oshawa Generals of the OHL for one year.

At the end of August, a U.S. federal court judge granted a preliminary injunction allowing Aquino to play in the OHL as a 20-year-old 'overeager'. The injunction was granted, but the OHL appealed, forcing Aquino to make a decision between returning to Merrimack or playing in the OHL. Aquino filed a lawsuit against the OHL in an attempt to follow in the footsteps of Mike Van Ryn. Aquino joined the Oshawa Generals Sept. 25, 2002, and played 14 games before the OHL ruled him ineligible on Nov. 5. He scored 10 goals and had nine assists in 14 games with Oshawa of the Ontario Hockey League.

Aquino refused to sign with Dallas and forced a trade. On March 11, 2003, The Atlanta Thrashers acquired Aquino, the twenty-year-old right wing, from the Dallas Stars for a sixth-round draft pick.

The Atlanta Thrashers then signed Aquino and sent him to the Chicago Wolves of the AHL.

Atlanta assigned Aquino to the Chicago Wolves for five games to end the 2002–03 season. He then played almost all of the 2003–04 season for the Thrashers ECHL affiliate, the Gwinnett Gladiators. During the 2004 NHL lockout, Aquino was bought out of his contract by the Thrashers and went to play in Europe.

Since 2004 he has played in Europe, primarily in the Deutsche Eishockey Liga, the Italian Serie A and the Danish AL-Bank Ligaen.

=== International ===
After moving to Italy, Aquino gained Italian citizenship. He played for the Italian men's national ice hockey team in their attempt to qualify for the 2010 Olympics, in Riga, Latvia.

=== Retirement ===
Aquino officially retired from hockey on January 21, 2016. Aquino had completed his degree from the University of Southern Denmark with a M.Sc. in Economics and Business Administration; he now works in finance.

== Personal life ==
Anthony has a brother Luciano Aquino and sister, and lives in Toronto with his wife and daughter.

== Career statistics ==
=== Regular season and playoffs ===
			Regular season					Playoffs
Season	Team	League	GP	G	A	Pts	PIM	GP	G	A	Pts	PIM
1997–98	Mississauga Chargers	OPJHL	50	10	13	23	14	—	—	—	—	—
1998–99	Bramalea Blues	OPJHL	47	31	44	75	31	—	—	—	—	—
1999–2000	Merrimack College	HE	36	15	14	29	12	—	—	—	—	—
2000–01	Merrimack College	HE	38	17	25	42	22	—	—	—	—	—
2001–02	Merrimack College	HE	36	24	20	44	20	—	—	—	—	—
2002–03	Oshawa Generals	OHL	14	10	9	19	6	—	—	—	—	—
2002–03	Chicago Wolves	AHL	5	0	0	0	4	—	—	—	—	—
2003–04	Chicago Wolves	AHL	2	0	0	0	0	—	—	—	—	—
2003–04	Gwinnett Gladiators	ECHL	62	27	26	53	34	8	1	2	3	0
2004–05	Ritten Sport	ITA	26	16	10	26	20	6	0	0	0	0
2005–06	Adler Mannheim	DEL	48	2	5	7	33	—	—	—	—	—
2006–07	Stavanger Oilers	NOR	3	1	1	2	4	—	—	—	—	—
2006–07	Arboga IFK	Allsv	3	0	0	0	6	—	—	—	—	—
2006–07	HC Pustertal	ITA	26	12	17	29	0	4	4	2	6	2
2007–08	SG Pontebba	ITA	44	26	23	49	34	5	2	7	9	0
2008–09	SG Pontebba	ITA	42	20	18	38	18	5	1	2	3	0
2009–10	HC Valpellice	ITA	39	20	25	45	14	5	4	2	6	2
2010–11	HC Valpellice	ITA	40	17	32	49	10	8	5	2	7	25
2011–12	Brûleurs de Loups	FRA	16	8	15	23	8	20	9	9	18	18
2012–13	HC Valpellice	ITA	41	18	23	41	36	12	3	5	8	27
2013–14	KH Sanok	POL	18	10	19	29	30	—	—	—	—	—
2013–14	Odense Bulldogs	DEN	7	4	2	6	54	4	2	2	4	6
2014–15	Odense Bulldogs	DEN	30	11	17	28	32	1	0	1	1	0
2015–16	Rungsted Seier Capital	DEN	32	5	7	12	33	—	—	—	—	—
ITA totals			258	129	148	277	160	45	19	20	39	56

=== International ===
Year	Team	Event	GP	G	A	Pts	PIM
2009	Italy	OGQ	3	1	0	1	2
Senior totals			3	1	0	1	2

== Awards and honors ==
Award	Year
All-Hockey East Rookie Team	1999–00
All-Hockey East Second Team	2000–01
