= 2006 IIHF World Championship rosters =

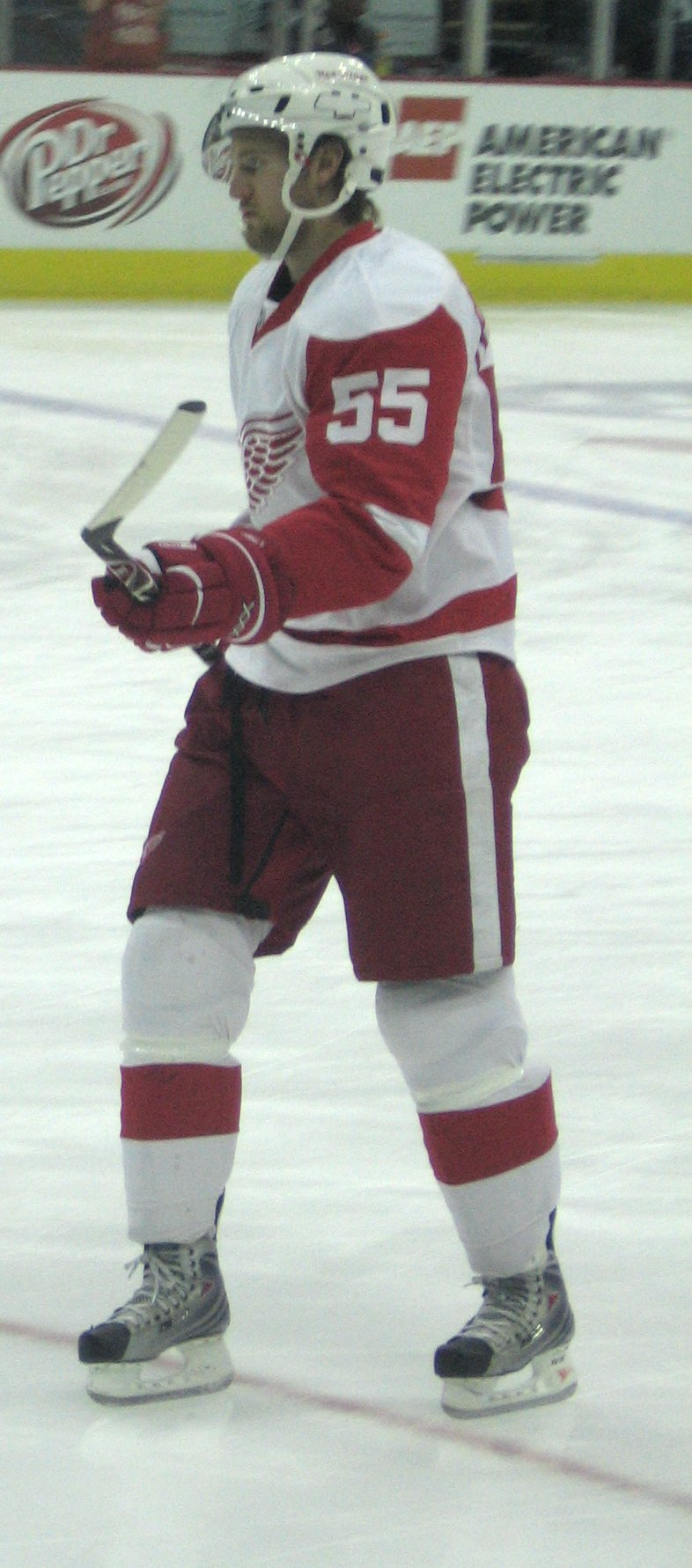
Niklas Kronwall of Sweden was named the tournament's most valuable player and top defenceman.

The 2006 IIHF World Championship rosters consisted of 370 players on 16 national ice hockey teams. Run by the International Ice Hockey Federation (IIHF), the Ice Hockey World Championships is the sport's highest-profile annual international tournament. The 2006 IIHF World Championship was the 70th edition of the tournament and was held in Riga, Latvia. Sweden won the Championship, the eighth time they had done so.

Before the start of the World Championship, each participating nation had to submit a list of players for its roster. A minimum of fifteen skaters and two goaltenders, and a maximum of twenty skaters and three goaltenders had to be selected. If a country selects fewer than the maximum allowed, they must choose the remaining players prior to the start of the tournament. After the start of the tournament, each team was allowed to select an additional two players, either skaters or goaltenders, to their roster, for a maximum roster of 25 players. Once players were registered to the team, they could not be removed from the roster.

To qualify for a national team under IIHF rules, a player must follow several criteria. He must be a citizen of the nation, and be under the jurisdiction of that national association. Players are allowed to switch which national team they play for, providing they fulfill the IIHF criteria. If participating for the first time in an IIHF event, the player would have had to play two consecutive years in the national competition of the new country without playing in another country. If the player has already played for a national team before, he may switch countries if he is a citizen of the new country, and has played for four consecutive years in the national competition of the new country. This switch may only happen once in the player's life.

Niklas Kronwall of Sweden was named the tournament's most valuable player and best defenceman by the IIHF directorate. Sidney Crosby of Canada led the tournament in goals and total point scoring, and was named the top forward. Swede Johan Holmqvist was selected as top goaltender. Finland's Fredrik Norrena led goaltenders in save percentage, with 0.951.

== Legend ==
Number	Uniform number	GP	Games played	W	Wins
F	Forward	G	Goals	L	Losses
D	Defenceman	A	Assists	Min	Minutes played
GK	Goaltender	Pts	Points	GA	Goals against
Club	Player's club before tournament	PIM	Penalties in minutes	GAA	Goals against average
T	Ties	SO	Shutouts	SV%	Save percentage

== Belarus ==
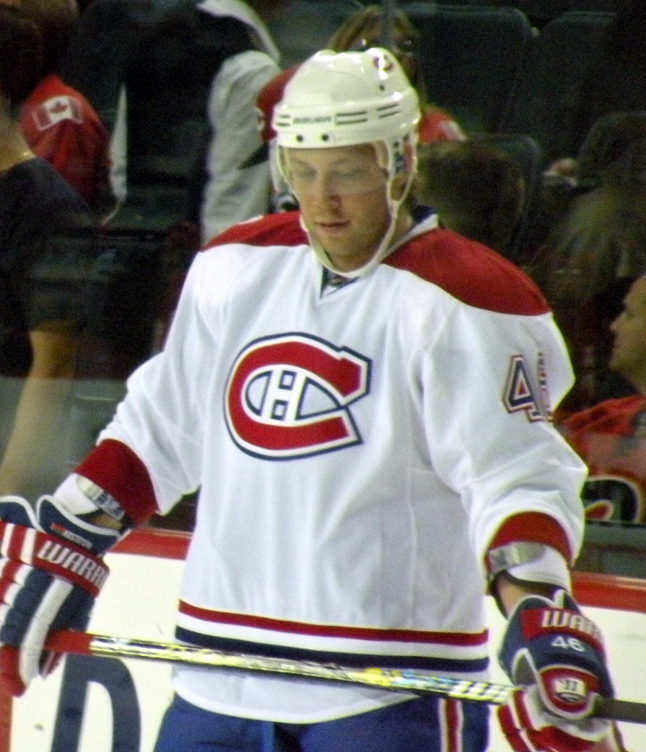
Andrei Kostitsyn was the only National Hockey League player on the Belarus roster.

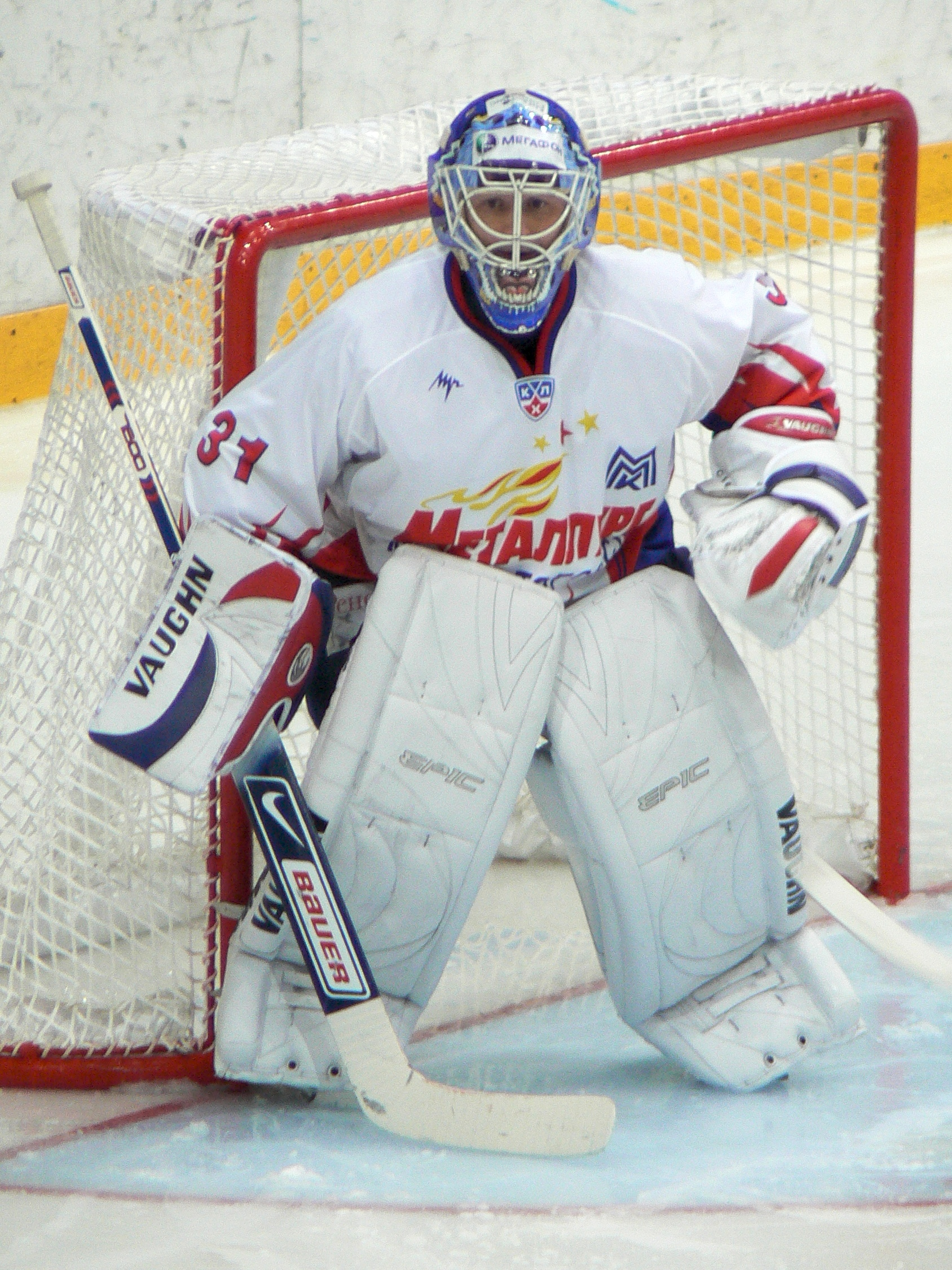
Andrei Mezin was the goaltender for Belarus in all seven games.

- Head coach: Glen Hanlon (USA)

=== Skaters ===
Number	Position	Player	Club	GP	G	A	Pts	PIM
10	F	Oleg Antonenko	HC Dinamo Minsk	7	3	1	4	2
68	F	Yaroslav Chupris	Salavat Yulaev Ufa	7	1	1	2	10
70	D	Vladimir Denisov	HC Keramin Minsk	6	0	1	1	35
77	F	Dmitry Dudik	HC Dinamo Minsk	7	3	0	3	2
7	D	Sergei Erkovich	Yunost Minsk	7	0	1	1	8
11	F	Evgeny Esaulov	HC Keramin Minsk	5	0	0	0	0
84	F	Mikhail Grabovsky	Dynamo Moscow	7	5	4	9	2
30	D	Vladimir Kopat	Yunost Minsk	6	1	1	2	12
23	F	Andrei Kostitsyn	Montreal Canadiens	6	1	4	5	6
43	D	Viktor Kostyuchenok	Yunost Minsk	7	1	1	2	0
26	F	Sergei Kukushkin	Kapitan Stupino	7	0	0	0	0
17	F	Evgeny Kurilin	HC Keramin Minsk	6	0	1	1	2
4	D	Alexander Makritski	HC Dinamo Minsk	7	1	1	2	8
19	F	Dmitry Meleshko	Salavat Yulaev Ufa	7	1	2	3	4
8	F	Andrei Mikhalev	HC Keramin Minsk	7	0	2	2	4
5	D	Alexander Ryadinsky	HC Keramin Minsk	4	0	0	0	2
12	F	Alexei Savin	Yunost Minsk	3	0	0	0	0
16	F	Andrei Skabelka	HC Dinamo Minsk	7	2	7	9	8
32	D	Vladimir Svito	HC Gomel	7	0	0	0	6
18	F	Alexei Ugarov	HC Neftekhimik Nizhnekamsk	7	0	2	2	4
22	F	Sergei Zadelenov	HC Neftekhimik Nizhnekamsk	7	4	4	8	6
27	D	Aleksandr Zhurik	HC Dinamo Minsk	4	0	1	1	0

=== Goaltenders ===
Number	Player	Club	GP	W	L	T	Min	GA	GAA	SV%	SO
33	Stepan Goryachevskikh	Yunost Minsk	0	–	–	–	–	–	–	–	–
31	Andrei Mezin	Salavat Yulaev Ufa	7	4	3	0	417	14	2.01	0.941	0
2	Sergei Shabanov	SKA St. Petersburg	0	–	–	–	–	–	–	–	–

== Canada ==
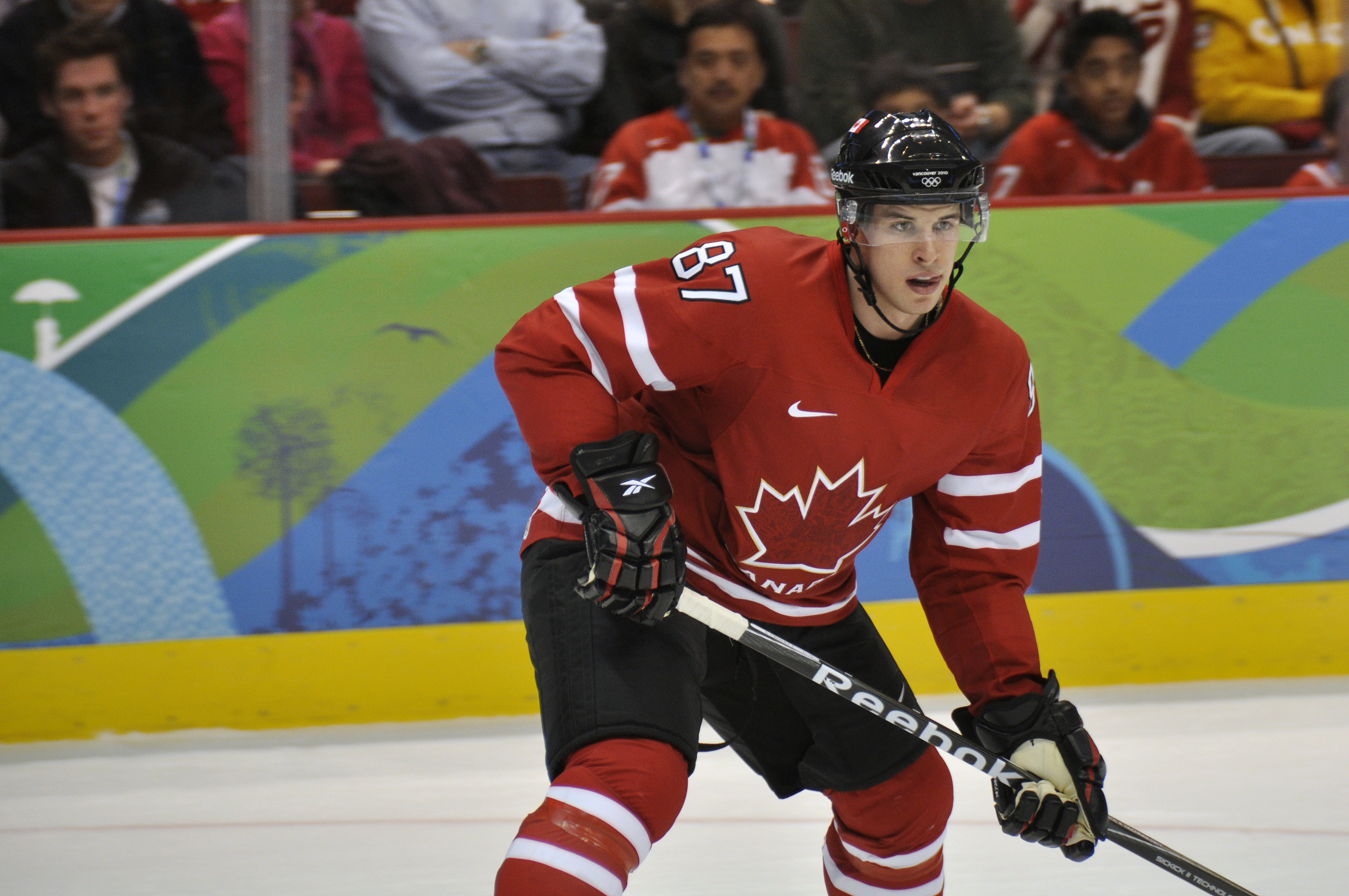
Sidney Crosby led all skaters in goals and total points, and was the tournament's best forward.

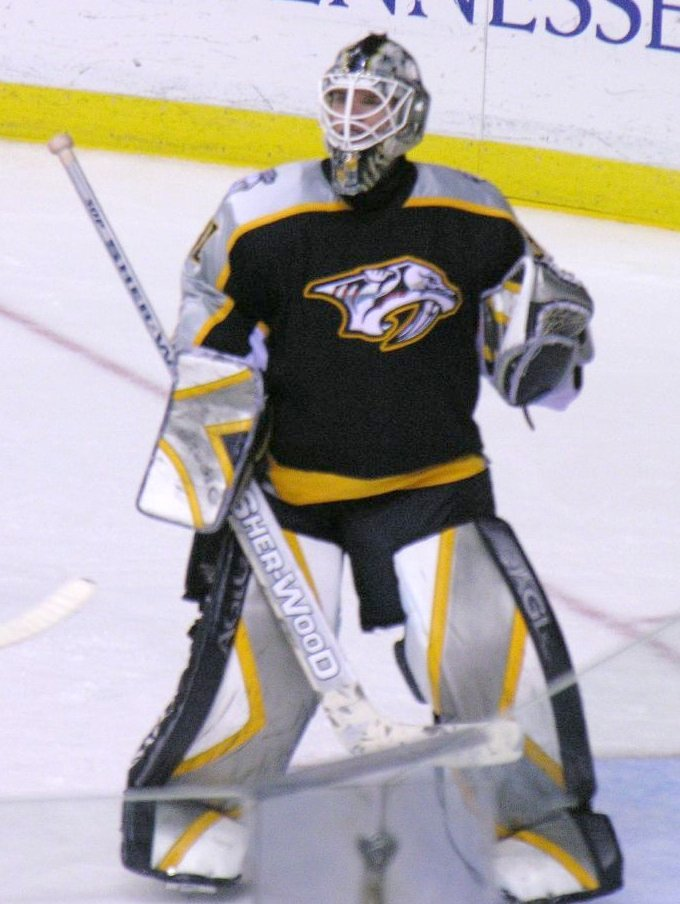
Chris Mason was the only one of Canada's three goaltenders to not play in any games.

- Head coach: Marc Habscheid (CAN)

=== Skaters ===
Number	Position	Player	Club	GP	G	A	Pts	PIM
37	F	Patrice Bergeron	Boston Bruins	9	6	8	14	2
26	F	Brad Boyes	Boston Bruins	9	4	4	8	4
19	F	Kyle Calder	Chicago Blackhawks	9	3	2	5	10
13	F	Mike Cammalleri	Los Angeles Kings	8	1	4	5	4
7	F	Jeff Carter	Philadelphia Flyers	9	4	2	6	2
89	F	Mike Comrie	Phoenix Coyotes	9	3	1	4	10
87	F	Sidney Crosby	Pittsburgh Penguins	9	8	8	16	10
16	D	Trevor Daley	Dallas Stars	7	0	1	1	10
25	D	Micki DuPont	Eisbären Berlin	9	0	1	1	4
2	D	Dan Hamhuis	Nashville Predators	9	1	4	5	10
17	F	Scott Hartnell	Nashville Predators	9	1	0	1	4
12	F	Glen Metropolit	HC Lugano	9	0	2	2	6
27	F	Matt Pettinger	Washington Capitals	8	1	0	1	4
18	F	Mike Richards	Philadelphia Flyers	9	3	2	5	10
3	D	Stéphane Robidas	Dallas Stars	9	1	1	2	6
20	F	Stacy Roest	Rapperswil-Jona Lakers	0	–	–	–	–
55	D	Nick Schultz	Minnesota Wild	9	0	2	2	6
5	D	Brent Seabrook	Chicago Blackhawks	8	0	0	0	2
14	F	Brendan Shanahan	Detroit Red Wings	8	3	1	4	10
6	D	Brad Stuart	Boston Bruins	9	0	3	3	14
29	F	Jason Williams	Detroit Red Wings	9	2	5	7	2

=== Goaltenders ===
Number	Player	Club	GP	W	L	T	Min	GA	GAA	SV%	SO
35	Alex Auld	Vancouver Canucks	5	2	3	0	274	13	2.85	0.893	1
50	Chris Mason	Nashville Predators	0	–	–	–	–	–	–	–	–
30	Marc Denis	Columbus Blue Jackets	5	4	1	0	263	11	2.51	0.911	1

== Czech Republic ==
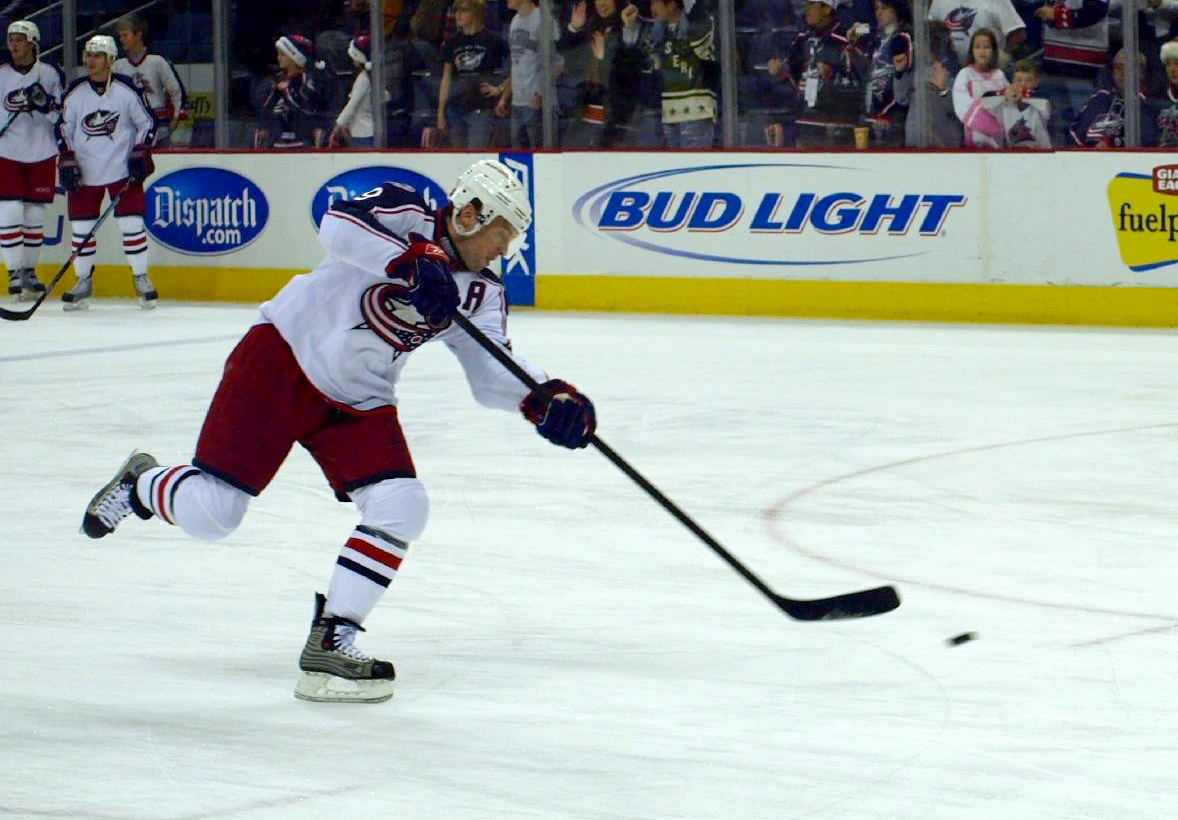
David Výborný led all Czech skaters in assists (six) and total points (nine).

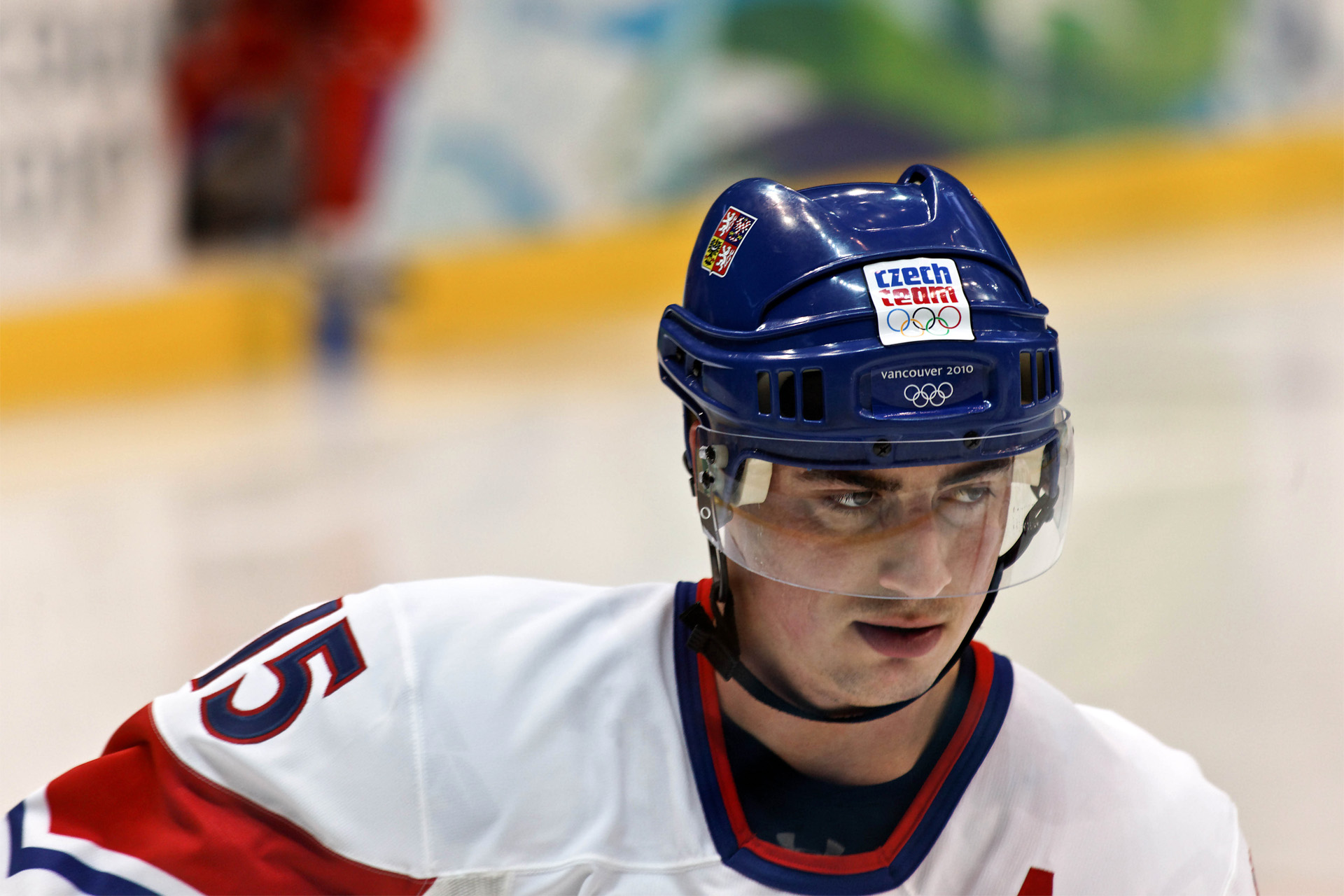
Tomáš Kaberle received 31 penalty minutes, most on the team.

- Head coach: Alois Hadamczik (CZE)

=== Skaters ===
Number	Position	Player	Club	GP	G	A	Pts	PIM
40	F	Jaroslav Balaštík	Columbus Blue Jackets	9	4	2	6	2
25	F	Jaroslav Bednář	HC Slavia Praha	7	0	0	0	0
44	D	Miroslav Blaťák	HC Zlin	0	–	–	–	–
38	D	Jan Bulis	Montreal Canadiens	9	0	0	0	0
91	F	Martin Erat	Nashville Predators	9	3	5	8	6
35	D	Jan Hejda	Khimik Moscow Oblast	9	0	0	0	4
27	D	Jan Hlaváč	Genève-Servette HC	9	2	1	3	4
17	F	Jaroslav Hlinka	HC Sparta Praha	9	2	4	6	2
10	F	Petr Hubáček	HC Vítkovice Steel	7	0	0	0	2
24	F	Zbyněk Irgl	HC Vitkovice Steel	6	2	2	4	0
15	D	Tomáš Kaberle	Toronto Maple Leafs	9	1	5	6	31
2	D	Lukáš Krajíček	Florida Panthers	9	0	0	0	8
80	D	Zdeněk Kutlák	HC České Budějovice	9	0	0	0	0
4	D	Zbyněk Michálek	Phoenix Coyotes	9	3	0	3	6
14	F	Tomáš Plekanec	Montreal Canadiens	9	3	0	3	20
53	F	Ivo Prorok	HC Slavia Praha	6	0	0	0	4
5	D	Martin Richter	HC Bílí Tygři Liberec	9	0	2	2	8
60	F	Tomáš Rolinek	HC Pardubice	8	0	0	0	0
41	D	Martin Škoula	Minnesota Wild	9	0	2	2	6
62	F	Petr Tenkrát	Karpat Oulu	8	1	0	1	10
9	F	David Výborný	Columbus Blue Jackets	9	3	6	9	2
77	F	Patrik Štefan	Atlanta Thrashers	9	1	0	1	4

=== Goaltenders ===
Number	Player	Club	GP	W	L	T	Min	GA	GAA	SV%	SO
33	Milan Hnilička	HC Bílí Tygři Liberec	9	5	2	2	548	24	2.63	0.893	0
42	Tomáš Pöpperle	Eisbären Berlin	0	–	–	–	–	–	–	–	–
31	Adam Svoboda	HC Pardubice	0	–	–	–	–	–	–	–	–

== Denmark ==
- Head coach: Mikael Lundstrom (SWE)

=== Skaters ===
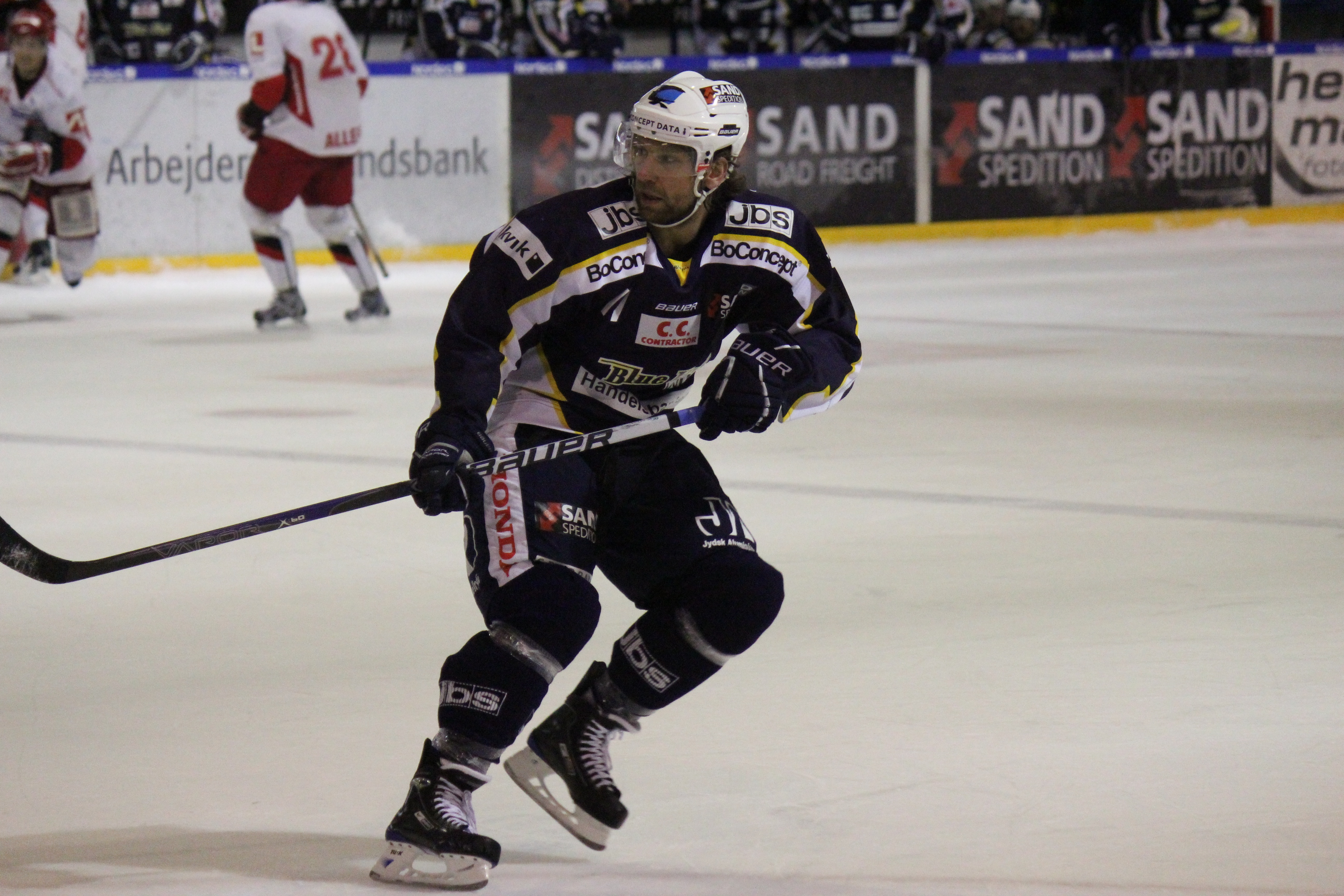
Kim Staal scored five goals in six games.

Number	Position	Player	Club	GP	G	A	Pts	PIM
25	D	Andreas Andreasen	Esbjerg IK	6	0	0	0	4
4	D	Mads Bødker	Rødovre Mighty Bulls	5	1	0	1	4
18	F	Mads Christensen	Herning Blue Fox	6	1	1	2	14
26	D	Morten Dahlmann	Nordsjælland Cobras	6	1	0	1	10
7	D	Jesper Damgaard	Modo Hockey	4	2	2	4	4
9	F	Kasper Degn	Nordsjælland Cobras	6	0	0	0	2
13	F	Morten Green	Modo Hockey	6	1	5	6	6
17	F	Jannik Hansen	Portland Winterhawks	6	2	0	2	6
47	D	Thomas Johnsen	Nordsjælland Cobras	6	0	1	1	2
16	F	Christoffer Kjærgaard	Herning Blue Fox	6	1	3	4	2
29	F	Morten Madsen	Frölunda HC	3	0	0	0	0
5	D	Daniel Nielsen	Herning Blue Fox	6	0	4	4	2
15	F	Frans Nielsen	Timrå IK	6	3	0	3	4
27	F	Jens Nielsen	Aalborg IK	6	1	2	3	2
10	F	Bo Nordby	Aalborg IK	6	0	0	0	4
2	D	Rasmus Pander	Odense Bulldogs	6	0	0	0	8
39	F	Martin Pyndt	Rødovre Mighty Bulls	6	0	0	0	0
12	F	Peter Regin	Timrå IK	6	0	0	0	8
18	F	Thomas Reinert	Frederikshavn White Hawks	3	0	0	0	2
20	F	Christian Schioldan	Frederikshavn White Hawks	6	0	0	0	2
11	F	Michael Smidt	Rødovre Mighty Bulls	6	0	0	0	2
19	F	Kim Staal	Malmö Redhawks	6	5	1	6	2

=== Goaltenders ===
Number	Player	Club	GP	W	L	T	Min	GA	GAA	SV%	SO
1	Patrick Galbraith	SønderjyskE	0	–	–	–	–	–	–	–	–
31	Peter Hirsch	Leksands IF	6	1	3	1	359	18	3.01	0.904	1
30	Michael Madsen	Herlev Hornets	0	–	–	–	–	–	–	–	–

== Finland ==
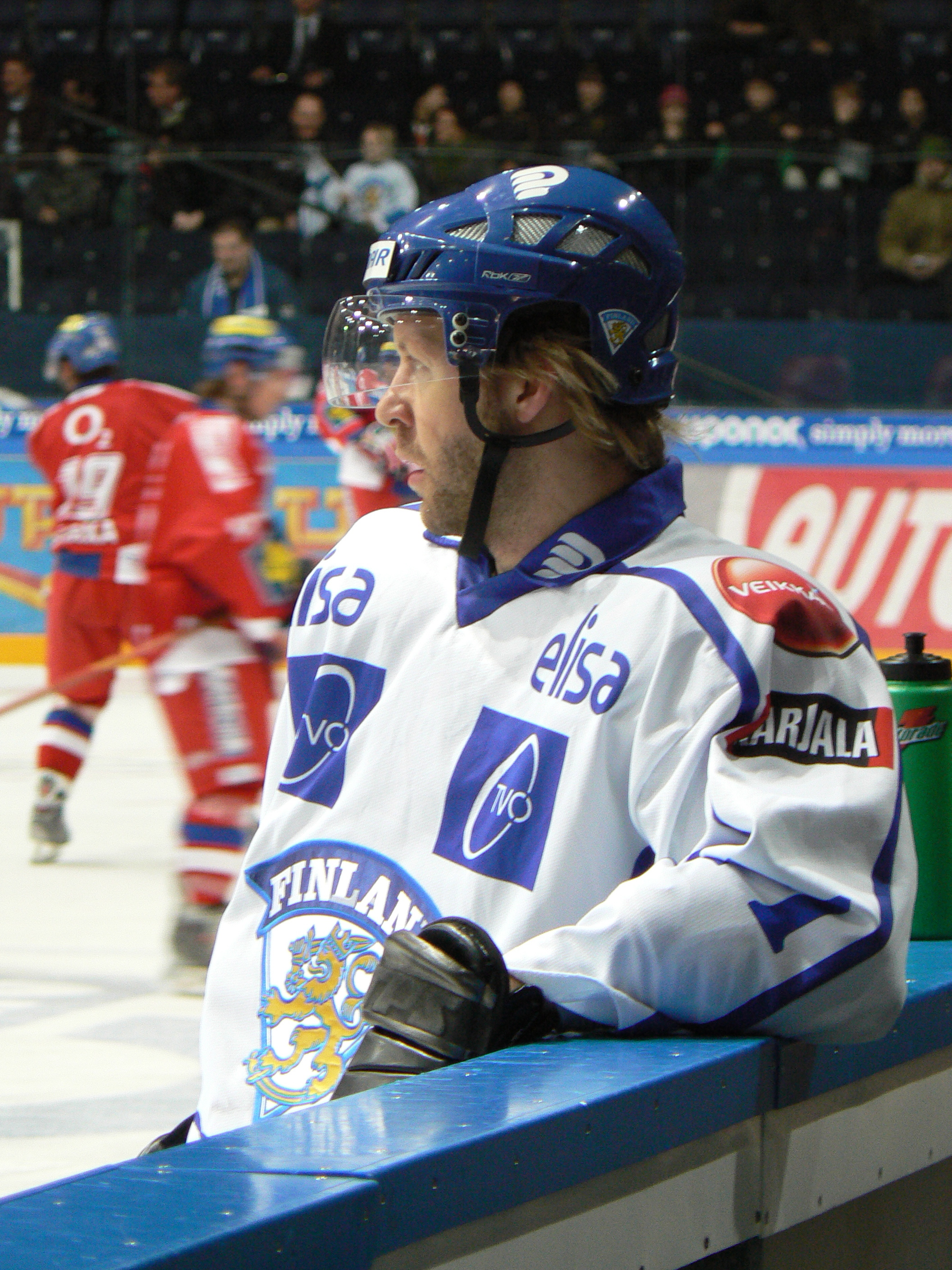
Tomi Kallio played in all nine of Finland's games, and recorded four goals and two assists.

- Head coach: Erkka Westerlund (FIN)

=== Skaters ===
Number	Position	Player	Club	GP	G	A	Pts	PIM
3	D	Petteri Nummelin	HC Lugano	9	3	11	14	2
5	D	Lasse Kukkonen	Kärpät	9	2	0	2	8
6	D	Pekka Saravo	Tappara	9	0	1	1	4
7	D	Aki Berg	Toronto Maple Leafs	9	2	0	2	6
9	D	Mikko Luoma	Linköpings HC	9	0	2	2	6
10	F	Sean Bergenheim	New York Islanders	9	2	1	3	4
12	F	Olli Jokinen	Florida Panthers	5	2	1	3	27
15	F	Tuomo Ruutu	Chicago Blackhawks	9	0	0	0	49
16	F	Ville Peltonen	HC Lugano	9	2	2	4	8
18	D	Tuukka Mäntylä	Tappara	9	0	0	0	8
20	F	Antti Miettinen	Dallas Stars	9	2	2	4	10
21	F	Mikko Koivu	Minnesota Wild	9	2	2	4	8
22	F	Tommi Santala	Jokerit	1	0	0	0	2
23	F	Riku Hahl	HC Davos	9	3	2	5	4
24	F	Jari Viuhkola	Kärpät	7	1	1	2	2
25	F	Jukka Hentunen	HC Lugano	9	1	3	4	20
28	F	Jani Rita	Edmonton Oilers	6	1	0	1	0
33	D	Mikko Lehtonen	Kärpät	9	1	4	5	14
36	F	Jussi Jokinen	Dallas Stars	9	2	6	8	2
37	F	Jarkko Ruutu	Vancouver Canucks	9	0	3	3	34
55	F	Esa Pirnes	Espoo Blues	8	1	3	4	4
71	F	Tomi Kallio	Frölunda HC	9	4	2	6	2

=== Goaltenders ===
Number	Player	Club	GP	W	L	Min	GA	GAA	SV%	SO
31	Antero Niittymäki	Philadelphia Flyers	4	2	1	211	6	1.70	0.926	2
30	Fredrik Norrena	Linköping	6	4	2	325	6	1.11	0.950	3
32	Niklas Bäckström	Kärpät	0	–	–	–	–	–	–	–

== Italy ==
- Head coach: Mickey Goulet (CAN)

=== Skaters ===
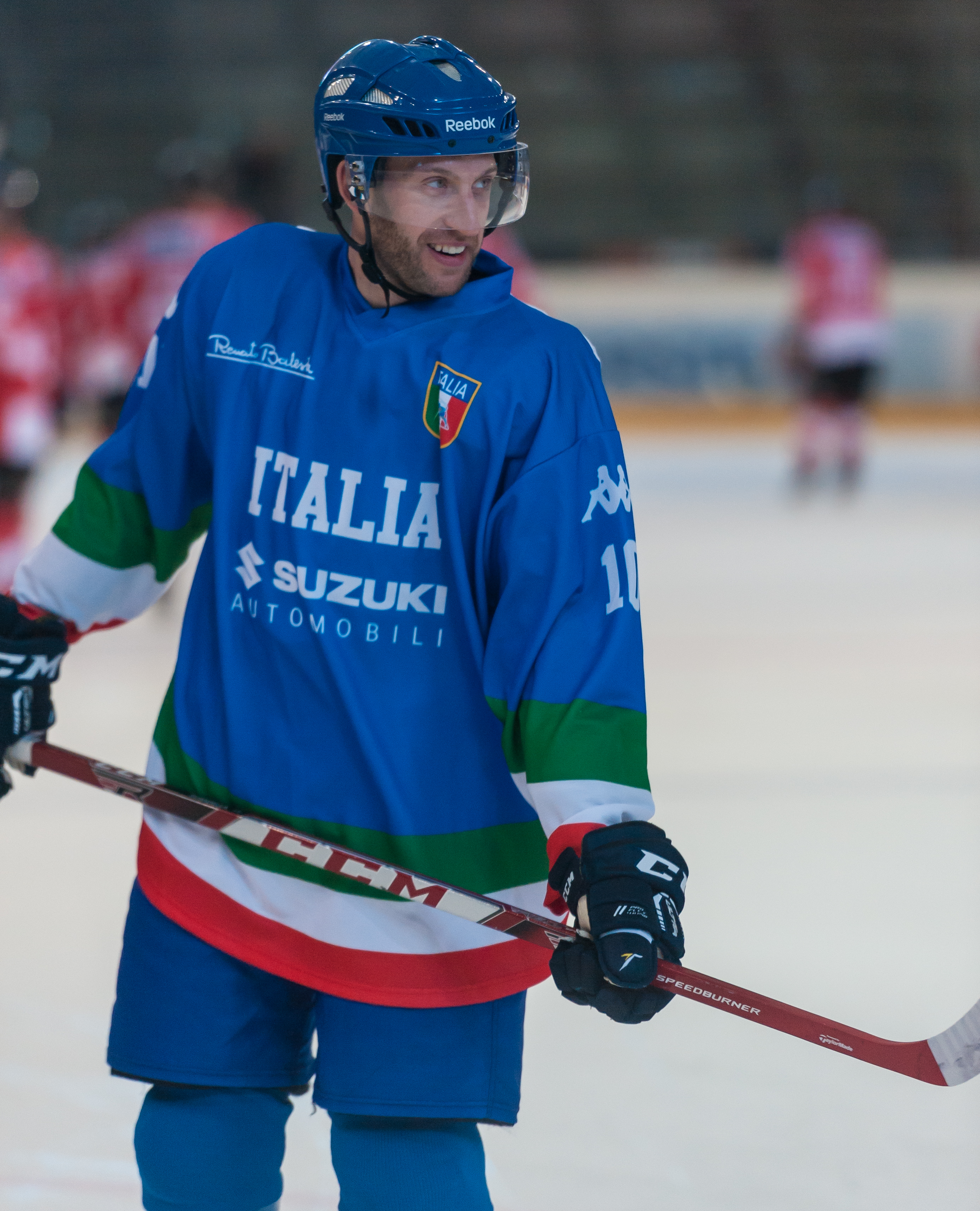
Giulio Scandella played in all six games for Italy.

Number	Position	Player	Club	GP	G	A	Pts	PIM
71	F	Luca Ansoldi	SG Cortina	6	2	0	2	6
50	D	Christian Borgatello	HC Junior Milano Vipers	6	1	1	2	4
18	F	Paolo Bustreo	Ritten Sport	6	0	0	0	2
34	F	Jason Cirone	Rio Grande Valley Killer Bees	6	0	2	2	18
9	F	Giorgio de Bettin	SG Cortina	6	0	2	2	14
28	F	Manuel de Toni	HC Alleghe	6	0	0	0	10
26	D	Armin Helfer	HC Junior Milano Vipers	6	1	1	2	16
14	D	Carlo Lorenzi	HC Alleghe	6	0	0	0	6
22	F	Stefano Margoni	SG Pontebba	6	0	1	1	8
16	F	John Parco	HC Asiago	4	0	2	2	4
8	D	Florian Ramoser	HC Bolzano Foxes	6	0	0	0	14
19	F	Roland Ramoser	HC Bolzano Foxes	2	0	0	0	25
11	F	Nicola Fontavive	Hockey Milano Rossoblu	6	0	0	0	4
13	F	Luca Rigoni	HC Junior Milano Vipers	2	0	0	0	2
6	D	Michele Strazzabosco	HC Junior Milano Vipers	6	1	0	1	18
3	D	Carter Trevisani	Södertälje SK	6	0	1	1	4
7	D	Alexander Egger	Ritten-Renon	6	0	0	0	2
15	F	Luca Felicetti	HC Fassa	6	0	0	0	2
17	F	Anthony Iob	EC KAC	3	1	0	1	18
21	F	Giuseppe Busillo	HC Milano	6	3	2	5	6
80	F	Enrico Chelodi	HC Bolzano	5	0	0	0	0
24	F	Andrea Molteni	HC Milano	6	0	1	1	0

=== Goaltenders ===
Number	Player	Club	GP	W	L	Min	GA	GAA	SV%	SO
85	Renè Baur	HC Val Pusteria	0	–	–	–	–	–	–	–
35	Thomas Tragust	Texas Tornado	2	0	1	54	1	1.10	0.963	1
29	Jason Muzzatti	Flint Generals	6	1	4	304	18	3.55	0.897	0

== Kazakhstan ==
- Head coach: Yerian Sagymbayev (KAZ)

=== Skaters ===
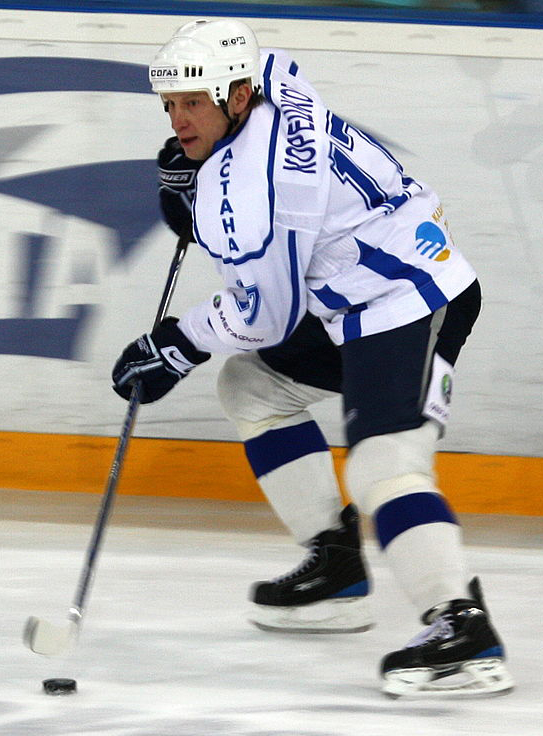
Alexander Koreshkov had two assists in six games.

Number	Position	Player	Club	GP	G	A	Pts	PIM
64	D	Artem Argokov	Metallurg Novokuznetsk	6	1	1	2	2
10	F	Maxim Belyayev	Salavat Yulaev Ufa	3	0	2	2	2
16	D	Yevgeni Blokhin	MVD Tver	6	0	1	1	22
52	D	Alexei Koledayev	Sibir Novosibirsk	6	0	0	0	6
17	F	Alexander Koreshkov	Torpedo Ust-Kamenogorsk	6	0	2	2	2
19	F	Yevgeni Koreshkov	Torpedo Ust-Kamenogorsk	6	1	1	2	16
12	D	Oleg Kovalenko	Torpedo Ust-Kamenogorsk	6	0	0	0	6
81	F	Vadim Krasnoslobodtsev	Avangard Omsk	6	1	1	2	4
7	F	Alexei Litvinenko	Spartak Moscow	6	1	1	2	10
2	D	Yevgeni Mazunin	Torpedo Ust-Kamenogorsk	6	0	0	0	8
22	F	Andrei Ogorondnikov	Torpedo Ust-Kamenogorsk	3	0	0	0	0
36	F	Sergei Ogureshnikov	Torpedo Ust-Kamenogorsk	6	1	2	3	4
23	F	Andrei Pchelyakov	Krylya Sovetov Moscow	6	1	1	2	10
43	D	Yevgeni Pupkov	SKA St. Petersburg	6	1	1	2	8
9	F	Vadim Rifel	Wölfe Freiburg	3	0	0	0	2
25	F	Andrei Samokhvalov	Khimik Moscow Oblast	6	1	0	1	2
26	D	Andrei Savenkov	Adler Mannheim	6	0	0	0	14
18	F	Konstantin Shafranov	Torpedo Nizhny Novgorod	6	0	1	1	8
48	F	Roman Starchenko	Torpedo Ust-Kamenogorsk	3	2	0	2	0
8	F	Andrei Trochshinsky	Torpedo Ust-Kamenogorsk	6	0	1	1	4
32	F	Nikolai Zarzhitski	Motor Barnaul	6	0	1	1	10
11	F	Talgat Zhailauov	Torpedo Ust-Kamenogorsk	6	1	1	2	16

=== Goaltenders ===
Number	Player	Club	GP	W	L	Min	GA	GAA	SV%	SO
41	Roman Medvedev	Gornak Rudnyj	1	0	1	30	7	14.17	0.500	0
35	Sergey Ogureshnikov	Torpedo Ust-Kamenogorsk	5	1	4	286	18	3.78	0.886	1
1	Sergey Tambulov	Metallurg Serov	2	0	2	44	4	5.44	0.833	0

== Latvia ==
- Head coach: Petr Vorobev (RUS)

=== Skaters ===
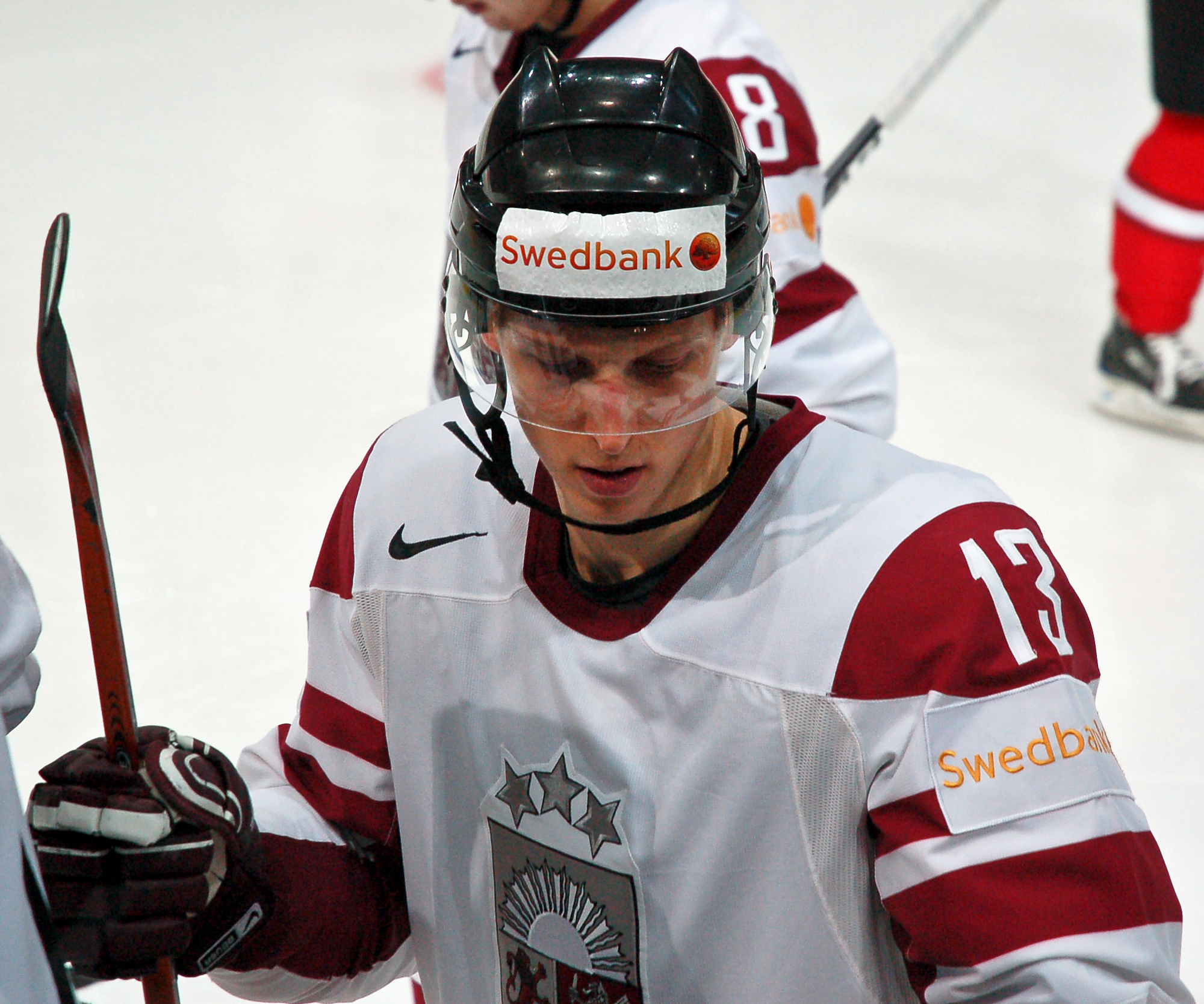
Defenceman Guntis Galviņš appeared in all six games for Latvia, however, did not score any points during the tournament.

Number	Position	Player	Club	GP	G	A	Pts	PIM
2	D	Kaspars Astašenko	Voskresensk Khimik	4	0	0	0	8
47	F	Mārtiņš Cipulis	HK Poprad	6	1	1	2	2
10	F	Lauris Dārziņš	HC Vsetín	6	2	0	2	6
21	F	Kaspars Daugaviņš	Toronto St. Michael's Majors	3	0	1	1	2
9	F	Viktors Bļinovs	Sport Vaasa	6	1	0	1	2
8	D	Guntis Galviņš	HK Riga 2000	6	0	0	0	8
6	D	Aleksandrs Jerofejevs	HK Poprad	6	1	0	1	6
11	D	Māris Jass	HK Liepājas Metalurgs	6	0	0	0	6
20	F	Juris Štāls	Charlotte Checkers	6	0	0	0	4
17	F	Aleksandrs Ņiživijs	Torpedo Nizhni Novgorod	6	0	3	3	4
13	F	Grigorijs Panteļejevs	HC Ponteba	4	0	0	0	0
18	D	Georgijs Pujacs	Khimik Moscow Oblast	6	0	0	0	18
24	F	Miķelis Rēdlihs	Junost Minsk	6	0	2	2	6
3	D	Arvīds Reķis	Augsburger Panther	6	1	0	1	4
4	D	Agris Saviels	HKm Zvolen	6	0	0	0	10
27	F	Aleksandrs Semjonovs	Traktor Chelyabinsk	6	3	0	3	8
16	F	Aleksejs Širokovs	Khimik Moscow Oblast	6	1	2	3	2
5	F	Jānis Sprukts	Florida Panthers	6	0	1	1	2
14	F	Leonīds Tambijevs	HC Merano	6	1	2	3	6
23	D	Atvars Tribuncovs	Färjestads BK Karlstad	6	0	1	1	8
12	F	Herberts Vasiļjevs	Krefeld Pinguine	6	1	0	1	10

=== Goaltenders ===
Number	Player	Club	GP	W	L	Min	GA	GAA	SV%	SO
31	Edgars Masaļskis	Neftyanik Almetyevsk	4	2	2	220	12	3.27	0.891	1
30	Sergejs Naumovs	HC Bolzano Foxes	3	0	3	143	10	4.18	0.828	0
1	Mârtiòð Raitums	HK Riga 2000	0	–	–	–	–	–	–	–

== Norway ==
- Head coach: Roy Johansen (NOR)

=== Skaters ===
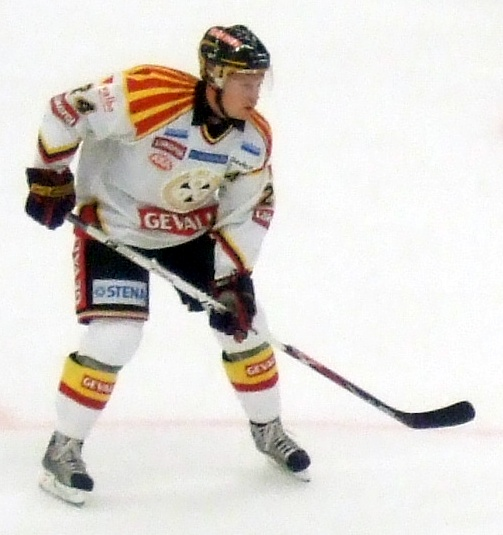
Mads Hansen had two points in six games for Norway.

Number	Position	Player	Club	GP	G	A	Pts	PIM
24	F	Jonas Andersen	IHK Sparta Sarpsborg	6	0	0	0	0
21	F	Morten Ask	Djurgårdens IF Stockholm	6	1	3	4	4
20	F	Anders Bastiansen	Mora IK	6	0	2	2	4
29	F	Tore Vikingstad	DEG Metro Stars	6	1	5	6	10
8	F	Mads Hansen	Brynäs IF Gavle	6	1	1	2	6
6	D	Jonas Holøs	IHK Sparta Sarpsborg	6	0	0	0	2
7	D	Tommy Jakobsen	Graz 99ers	6	1	1	2	10
9	F	Marius Holtet	Iowa Stars	6	1	1	2	4
36	D	Lars Erik Lund	Vålerenga Oslo	6	0	0	0	2
11	F	Lars Peder Nagel	IK Oskarshamn	6	0	0	0	4
28	F	Kjell Richard Nygård	Vålerenga Oslo	6	1	0	1	0
19	F	Per-Åge Skrøder	Södertälje	6	2	0	2	6
27	F	Tommy Marthinsen	Vålerenga IF	6	0	0	0	2
16	D	Erik Ryman	HC Alleghe	6	0	0	0	10
54	D	Anders Myrvold	ZSC Lions	6	0	3	3	12
10	F	Lars Erik Spets	Brynäs IF Gavle	6	0	0	0	0
41	F	Patrick Thoresen	Edmonton Oilers	5	2	0	2	6
56	D	Johnny Nilsen	Frisk Asker	6	0	0	0	6
14	F	Marius Trygg	Stavanger IK	6	0	0	0	4
23	D	Mats Trygg	Kölner Haie	5	1	2	3	12

=== Goaltenders ===
Number	Player	Club	GP	W	L	Min	GA	GAA	SV%	SO
30	Pål Grotnes	IK Comet Halden	2	0	2	93	9	5.81	0.816	0
39	Mathias Gundersen	Stavanger IK	5	1	4	267	14	3.15	.905	0
1	Jonas Norgren	Storhamar Dragons	0	–	–	–	–	–	–	–

== Russia ==
- Head coach: Vladimir Krikunov (RUS)

=== Skaters ===
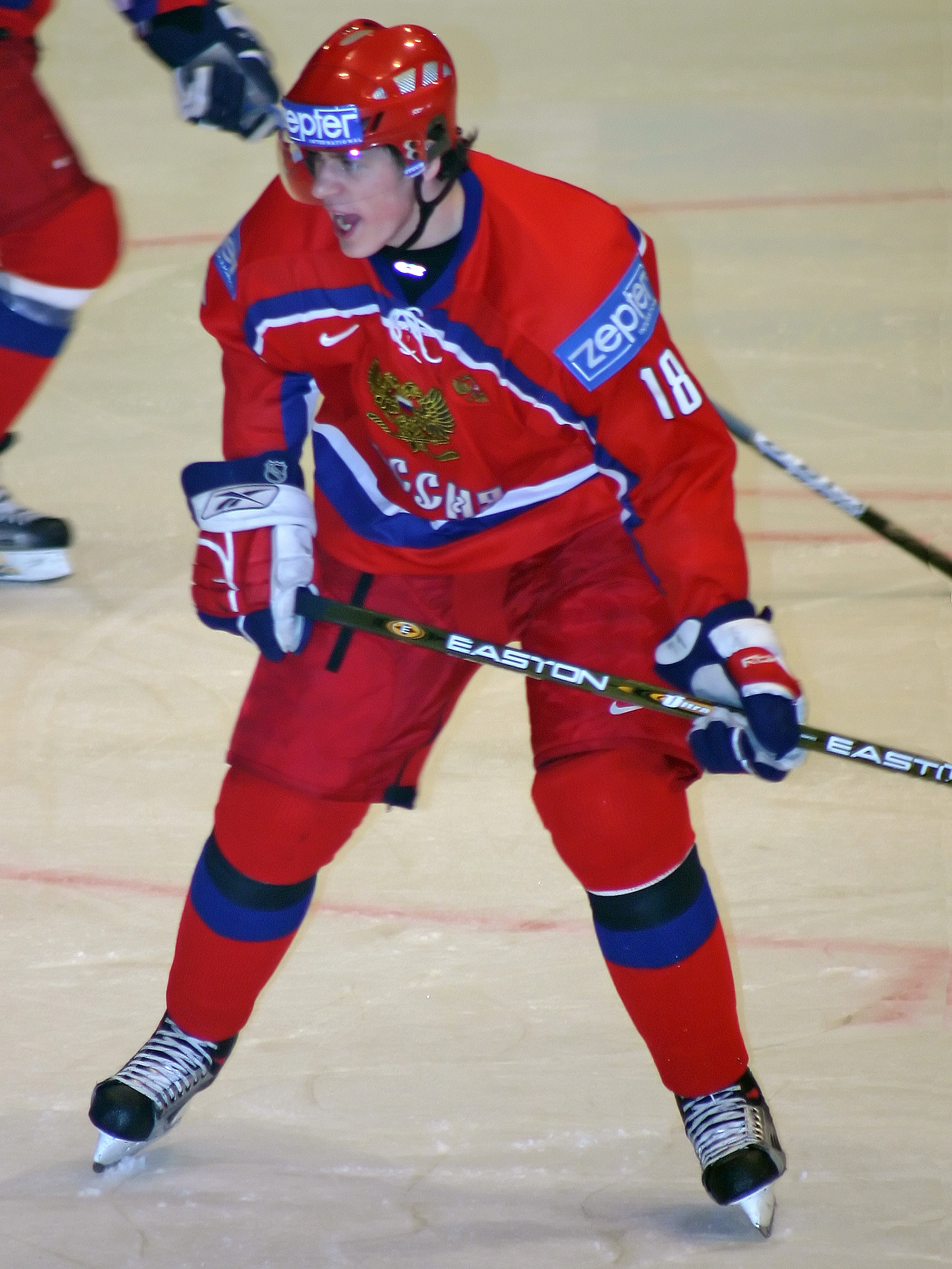
Evgeni Malkin played seven games, recording three goals and nine points.

Number	Position	Player	Club	GP	G	A	Pts	PIM
27	D	Vitali Atyushov	Metallurg Magnitogorsk	7	0	2	2	10
18	F	Konstantin Gorovikov	Avangard Omsk	7	1	3	4	8
4	D	Andrei Kruchinin	Lada Togliatti	5	0	2	2	4
10	F	Sergei Mozyakin	CSKA Moscow	4	2	1	3	0
55	D	Dmitry Bykov	Dynamo Moscow	7	2	1	3	6
7	F	Alexei Mikhnov	Lokomotiv Yaroslavl	7	4	2	6	2
21	F	Alexander Kharitonov	Dynamo Moscow	4	1	0	1	4
6	D	Ilya Nikulin	Ak Bars Kazan	7	1	5	6	8
2	D	Georgi Misharin	CSKA Moscow	3	0	1	1	4
71	F	Evgeni Malkin	Metallurg Magnitogorsk	7	3	6	9	6
15	F	Nikolai Kulemin	Metallurg Magnitogorsk	7	1	3	4	2
14	F	Igor Grigorenko	Severstal Cherepovets	7	1	2	3	8
16	D	Kirill Koltsov	Avangard Omsk	6	0	0	0	27
28	D	Denis Kulyash	Dynamo Moscow	7	3	1	4	6
32	F	Alexander Semin	Mytischi Khimik	7	3	3	6	8
5	D	Sergei Zhukov	Lokomotiv Yaroslavl	7	0	1	1	8
8	F	Alexander Ovechkin	Washington Capitals	7	6	3	9	6
33	F	Maxim Sushinsky	Dynamo Moscow	7	2	4	6	0
38	D	Vadim Khomitsky	CSKA Moscow	7	0	3	3	2
79	F	Denis Arkhipov	Khimik Moscow Oblast	7	2	4	6	6
12	F	Danis Zaripov	Ak Bars Kazan	6	2	3	5	4
97	F	Igor Yemeleyev	SKA Saint Petersburg	7	1	2	3	8

=== Goaltenders ===
Number	Player	Club	GP	W	L	Min	GA	GAA	SV%	SO
45	Alexander Fomichev	Amur Khabarovsk	2	2	0	21	0	0.00	1.000	2
39	Maxim Sokolov	SKA Saint Petersburg	2	0	1	129	7	3.24	0.892	0
40	Sergei Zvyagin	Dynamo Moscow	5	5	0	278	9	1.94	0.914	1

== Slovakia ==
- Head coach: Frantisek Hossa (SVK)

=== Skaters ===
Number	Position	Player	Club	GP	G	A	Pts	PIM
2	D	Stanislav Hudec	HC Vitkovice	0	–	–	–	–
28	F	Ivan Čiernik	Kölner Haie	7	2	3	5	8
6	F	Miroslav Zálešák	Södertälje SK	7	0	1	1	2
8	F	Martin Cibák	Tampa Bay Lightning	7	1	1	2	8
15	D	Dominik Graňák	HC Slavia Praha	7	0	0	0	6
71	F	Tomáš Harant	Lowell Devils	7	0	0	0	4
81	F	Marián Hossa	Atlanta Thrashers	5	1	6	7	0
68	D	Milan Jurčina	Washington Capitals	7	2	1	3	8
22	F	Richard Kapuš	Metallurg Novokuznetsk	7	3	2	5	4
9	F	Ľubomír Vaic	HC Bílí Tygři Liberec	7	0	0	0	2
16	F	Milan Bartovič	Norfolk Admirals	7	2	4	6	8
11	D	Dušan Milo	HK Nitra	7	3	3	6	2
12	F	Michal Hudec	HC České Budějovice	3	1	0	1	0
14	D	Andrej Meszároš	Ottawa Senators	1	0	0	0	0
19	F	Rastislav Pavlikovský	MODO Hockey	7	1	6	7	4
23	D	René Vydarený	HC České Budějovice	7	1	0	1	6
21	F	Miroslav Kovacik	HK Nitra	7	2	1	3	4
27	F	Andrej Kollár	HK Nitra	7	2	2	4	10
75	D	Richard Stehlík	HC Sparta Praha	7	0	0	0	2
7	D	Martin Štrbák	HC CSKA Moscow	7	1	1	2	8
43	F	Tomáš Surový	Luleå HF	7	2	2	4	4
91	F	Marcel Hossa	New York Rangers	7	1	3	4	6

=== Goaltenders ===
Number	Player	Club	GP	W	L	Min	GA	GAA	SV%	SO
25	Ján Lašák	HC Pardubice	1	0	1	40	2	3.00	0.846	0
31	Rastislav Staňa	Södertälje SK	0	–	–	–	–	–	–	–
60	Karol Križan	MODO Ornskoldsvik	7	3	3	379	12	1.90	0.915	3

== Slovenia ==
- Head coach: Frantisek Vyborny (CZE)

=== Skaters ===
Number	Position	Player	Club	GP	G	A	Pts	PIM
3	D	Robert Ciglenečki	SG Cortina	6	0	0	0	10
28	D	Aleš Kranjc	HK Jesenice	6	4	2	6	10
6	D	Boštjan Groznik	HDD Olimpija Ljubljana	6	0	0	0	2
10	F	Dejan Varl	HK Jesenice	6	0	0	0	4
15	F	Egon Muric	HDD Olimpija Ljubljana	6	1	0	1	4
9	F	Tomaž Razingar	HK Jesenice	6	2	4	6	2
12	D	David Rodman	HK Jesenice	6	0	0	0	16
13	F	Anže Kopitar	Södertälje SK	6	0	0	0	16
17	F	Jurij Goličič	HK Jesenice	6	0	0	0	10
22	D	Marcel Rodman	HK Jesenice	6	0	4	4	6
24	F	Anže Terlikar	HK Jesenice	5	0	0	0	2
27	D	Jakob Milovanovič	Briançon	1	0	0	0	0
37	D	Mitja Robar	HDD Olimpija Ljubljana	6	0	0	0	25
14	F	Dejan Kontrec	Slavija Ljubljana	4	1	0	1	4
19	D	Uroš Vidmar	Slavija Ljubljana	6	0	1	1	12
18	D	Tomo Hafner	HK Jesenice	6	0	1	1	4
21	F	Jaka Avgustinčič	Slavija Ljubljana	6	0	0	0	2
42	F	Mitja Šivic	HDD Olimpija Ljubljana	6	1	0	1	2
74	F	Rok Pajič	HC Bílí Tygři Liberec	1	0	0	0	0
7	D	Mitja Sotlar	HK Jesenice	6	2	1	3	4
78	F	Luka Žagar	HK Jesenice	6	0	1	1	2
84	F	Andrej Hebar	Slavija Ljubljana	6	0	0	0	2

=== Goaltenders ===
Number	Player	Club	GP	W	L	Min	GA	GAA	SV%	SO
30	Gaber Glavič	HK Acroni Jesenice	1	0	1	13	4	17.93	0.636	0
20	Andrej Hočevar	HDD Olimpija Ljubljana	0	–	–	–	–	–	–	–
33	Robert Kristan	HK Acroni Jesenice	6	0	4	96	22	3.81	0.887	0

== Sweden ==
- Head coach: Bengt-Åke Gustafsson (SWE)

=== Skaters ===
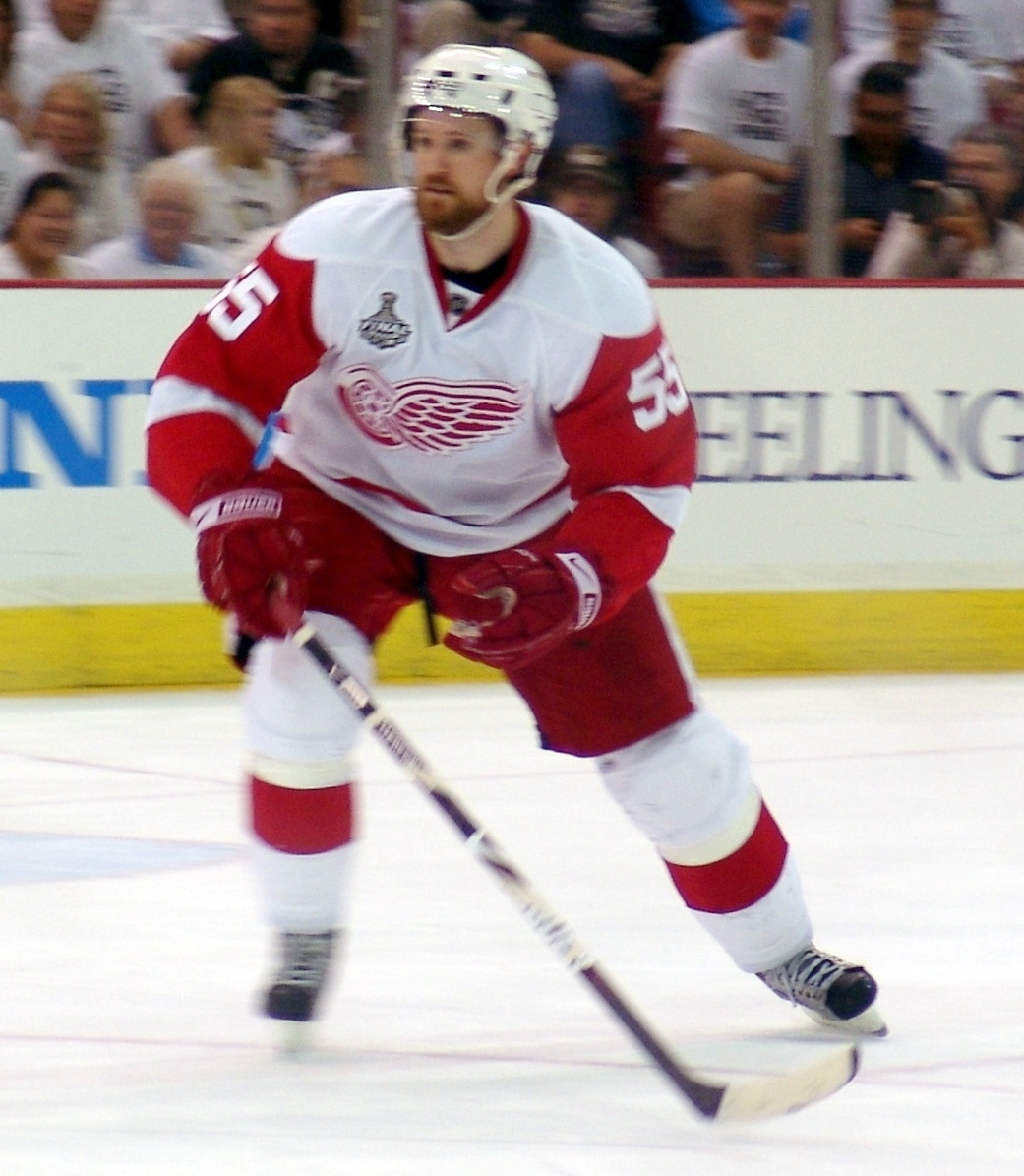
Niklas Kronwall led the team in points with two goals and eight assists. He was additionally named the tournament MVP.

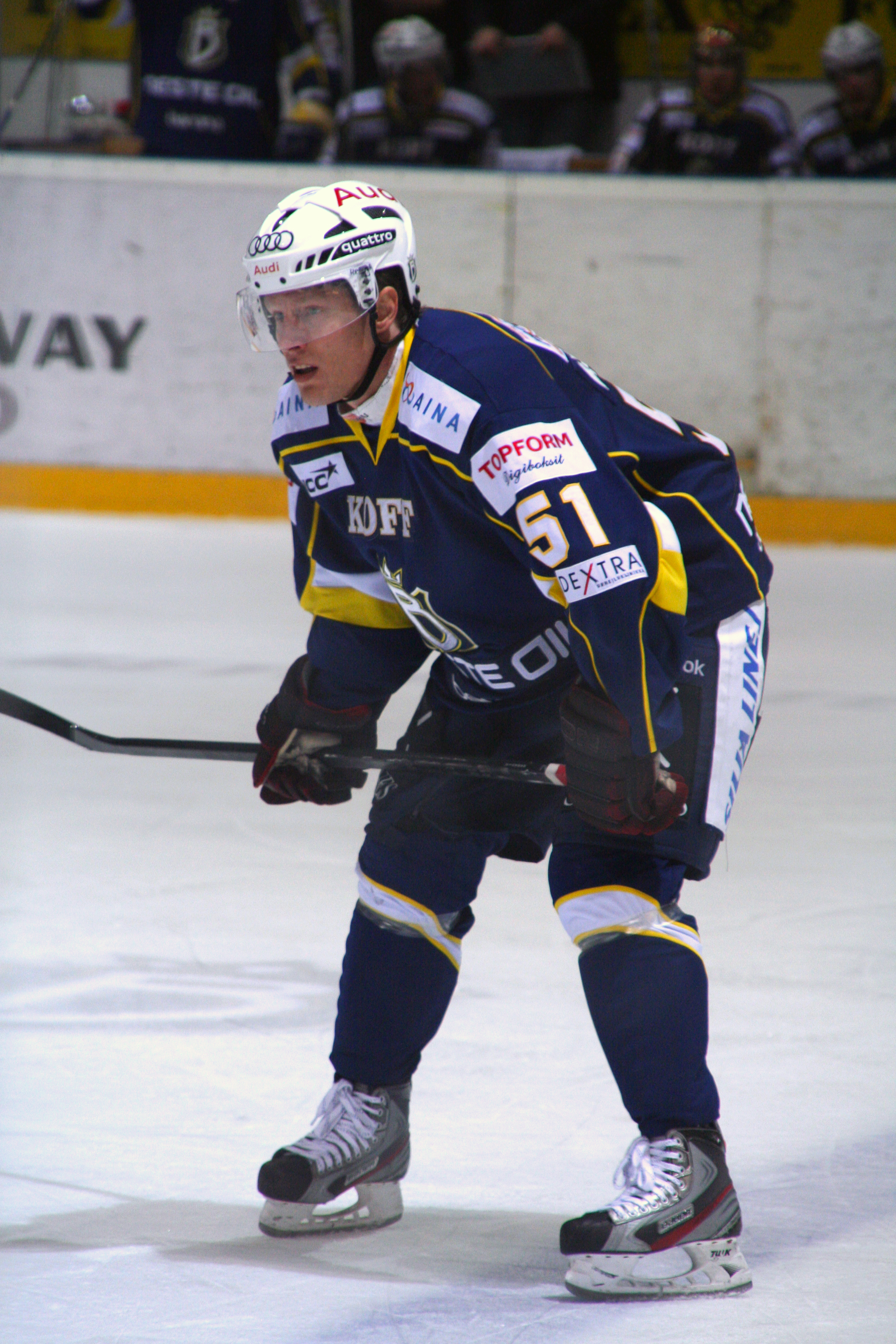
Defenseman Mika Hannula was suspended from the final game against Czech Republic as a result of crosschecking Sidney Crosby during a goal celebration.

Number	Position	Player	Club	GP	G	A	Pts	PIM
3	D	Mattias Timander	MODO Hockey	9	0	3	3	6
6	D	Magnus Johansson	Linköpings HC	9	2	3	5	2
7	D	Niklas Kronwall	Detroit Red Wings	8	2	8	10	10
9	F	Tony Mårtensson	Linköpings HC	9	1	1	2	4
11	F	Jesper Mattsson	Färjestad BK	9	2	3	5	4
16	F	Jonas Nordquist	Luleå HF	9	2	2	4	6
17	F	Mathias Johansson	Farjestads BK Karlstad	4	0	0	0	4
18	D	Per Hållberg	Färjestads BK	9	1	2	3	16
19	F	Nicklas Bäckström	Brynäs IF	4	0	0	0	0
20	F	Joel Lundqvist	Frölunda HC	8	1	0	1	4
23	D	Ronnie Sundin	Frölunda HC	9	0	3	3	12
24	F	Andreas Karlsson	HV71	9	5	4	9	6
25	D	Andreas Holmqvist	Linköpings HC	9	0	1	1	0
29	D	Kenny Jönsson	Rögle BK	9	3	3	6	6
31	F	Björn Melin	HV71	6	0	2	2	0
33	F	Fredrik Emvall	Linköpings HC	9	3	2	5	4
37	F	Mikael Samuelsson	Detroit Red Wings	8	4	5	9	4
39	F	Johan Franzén	Detroit Red Wings	8	0	3	3	12
40	F	Henrik Zetterberg	Detroit Red Wings	8	2	3	5	6
51	F	Mika Hannula	HV71	8	4	1	5	35
72	F	Jörgen Jönsson	Färjestads BK	9	2	0	2	6
92	F	Michael Nylander	New York Rangers	6	1	8	9	4

=== Goaltenders ===
Number	Player	Club	GP	W	L	Min	GA	GAA	SV%	SO
34	Daniel Henriksson	Färjestads BK	2	0	1	60	5	5.00	0.761	0
30	Johan Holmqvist	Brynäs IF	7	5	2	420	14	2.00	0.908	2
1	Stefan Liv	HV71	1	1	0	60	0	0.00	1.000	1

== Switzerland ==
- Head coach: Ralph Krueger (GER)

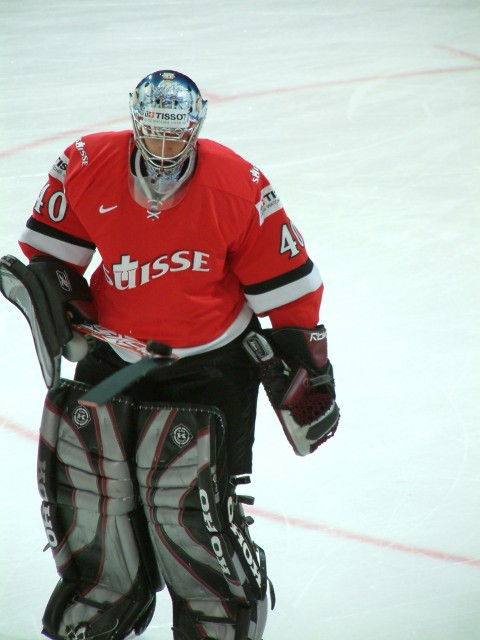
Goaltender David Aebischer played all six games for the Swiss team.

=== Skaters ===
Number	Position	Player	Club	GP	G	A	Pts	PIM
10	F	Andres Ambühl	HC Davos	6	1	1	2	8
57	D	Goran Bezina	Genève-Servette HC	6	2	1	3	4
5	D	Severin Blindenbacher	ZSC Lions	5	0	2	2	12
6	D	Timo Helbling	Tampa Bay Lightning	4	0	0	0	2
12	F	Patric Della Rossa	EHC Basel	6	1	1	2	4
14	F	Alain Demuth	HC Ambrì-Piotta	1	0	0	0	0
29	D	Beat Forster	ZSC Lions	6	1	0	1	12
2	D	Beat Gerber	SC Bern	2	0	0	0	2
18	F	Thomas Déruns	Genève-Servette HC	6	0	1	1	29
35	F	Sandy Jeannin	HC Lugano	6	1	4	5	2
67	F	Romano Lemm	Kloten Flyers	6	0	2	2	2
28	F	Martin Plüss	Frölunda HC	6	2	3	4	14
23	F	Thierry Paterlini	ZSC Lions	6	1	0	1	6
36	F	Marc Reichert	SC Bern	6	1	1	2	0
32	F	Ivo Rüthemann	SC Bern	6	2	2	4	0
31	D	Mathias Seger	ZSC Lions	5	0	0	0	0
37	F	Raffaele Sannitz	HC Lugano	6	2	0	2	10
11	D	Martin Steinegger	SC Bern	6	0	0	0	4
7	D	Mark Streit	Montreal Canadiens	6	0	3	3	6
3	D	Julien Vauclair	HC Lugano	6	0	0	0	4
88	F	Kevin Romy	HC Lugano	6	0	0	0	2
27	F	Valentin Wirz	HC Lugano	6	1	1	2	2

=== Goaltenders ===
Number	Player	Club	GP	W	L	Min	GA	GAA	SV%	SO
40	David Aebischer	Montreal Canadiens	6	2	2	359	16	2.67	0.882	0
20	Jonas Hiller	HC Davos	0	–	–	–	–	–	–	–
44	Marco Buhrer	SC Bern	0	–	–	–	–	–	–	–

== Ukraine ==
- Head coach: Oleksandr Seukand (UKR)

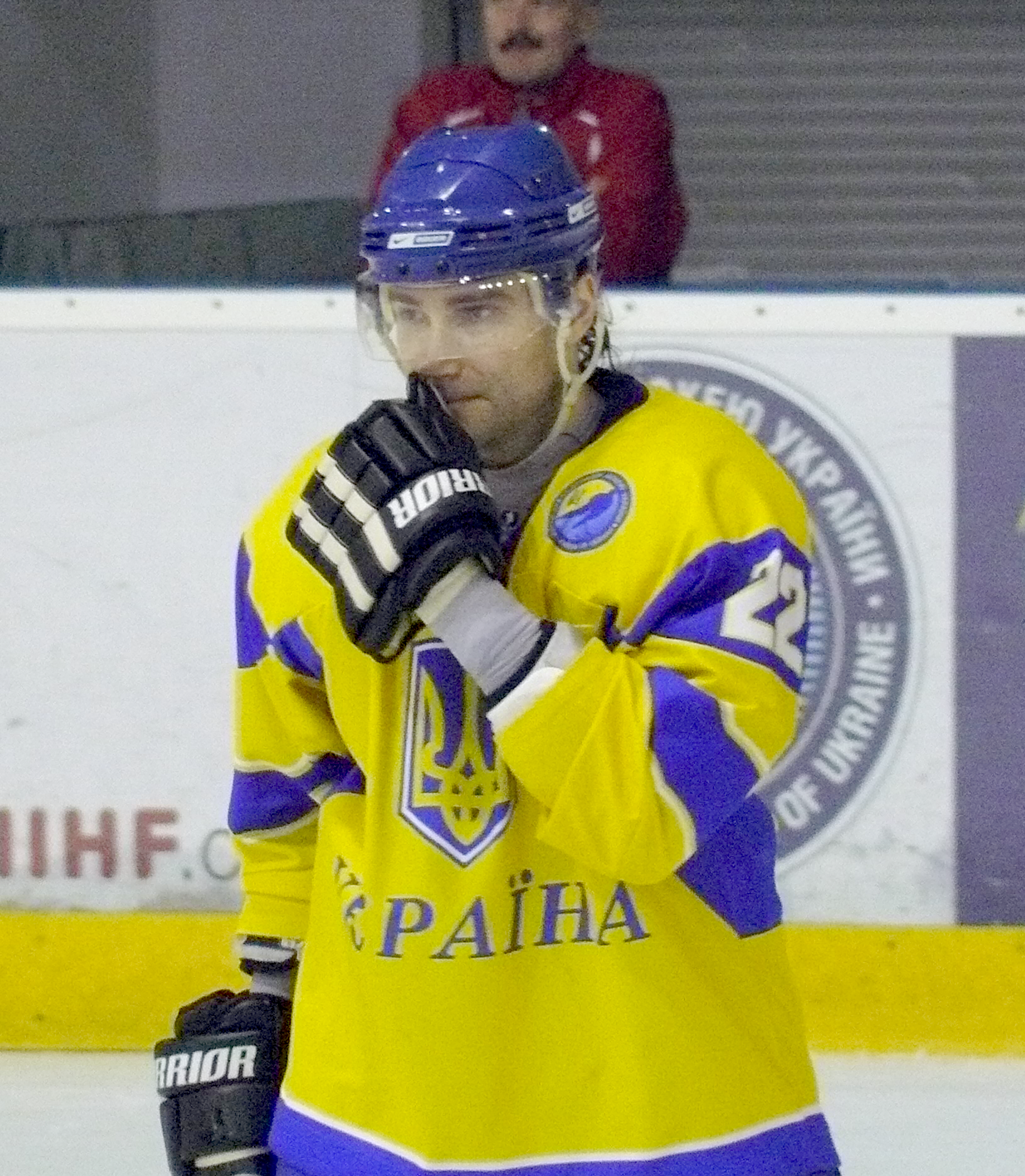
Serhiy Klymentiev led Ukraine in scoring with four points.

=== Skaters ===
Number	Position	Player	Club	GP	G	A	Pts	PIM
5	D	Denis Isayenko	Sokil Kyiv	3	0	0	0	6
8	F	Oleksandr Bobkin	Sokil Kyiv	2	0	0	0	25
7	F	Valentyn Oletsky	Sokil Kyiv	6	0	1	1	0
21	F	Oleksandr Materukhin	Khimvolokno-Mogilev	6	0	1	1	10
24	F	Vitalii Donka	HC Donbass	2	0	0	0	2
2	D	Iurii Gunko	Sokil Kyiv	6	0	0	0	6
4	D	Vasyl Polonytskiy	HK Gomel	5	0	1	1	2
11	D	Artem Ostroushko	Moscow Spartak	6	0	1	1	4
3	D	Serhiy Klymentiev	HC MVD Moscow Oblast	5	0	0	0	26
10	F	Vadym Shakhraychuk	Dynamo Moscow	6	0	1	1	28
15	F	Vitaliy Lytvynenko	Sokil Kyiv	6	0	1	1	2
16	F	Vasyl Bobrovnikov	Sokil Kyiv	6	0	2	2	0
18	F	Yuriy Dyachenko	Chekhov Vityaz	6	1	2	3	6
25	F	Oleg Shafarenko	Sokil Kyiv	6	0	1	1	4
9	D	Yuriy Navarenko	Sokil Kyiv	6	0	0	0	2
23	F	Roman Salnikov	Keramin Minsk	6	1	0	1	2
29	F	Vitaliy Semenchenko	Yunost Minsk	3	0	0	0	2
27	F	Kostiantyn Kasianchuk	Voskresensk Khimik	6	2	0	2	12
6	D	Andriy Sryubko	HC Dmitrov	6	0	1	1	2
31	D	V'iacheslav Zavalniuk	HC Donbass	4	0	0	0	18
34	F	Borys Protsenko	Dinamo Minsk					
30	D	Andriy Mikhnov	Tolyatti Lada	6	2	0	2	2

=== Goaltenders ===
Number	Player	Club	GP	W	L	Min	GA	GAA	SV%	SO
22	Oleksandr Fedorov	Khimvolokno Mogilev	0	–	–	–	–	–	–	–
20	Igor Karpenko	Keramin Minsk	3	0	3	180	16	5.33	0.857	0
1	Kostyantyn Simchuk	Sokil Kyiv	3	1	2	180	15	5.00	0.857	0

== United States ==
- Head coach: Mike Eaves (USA)

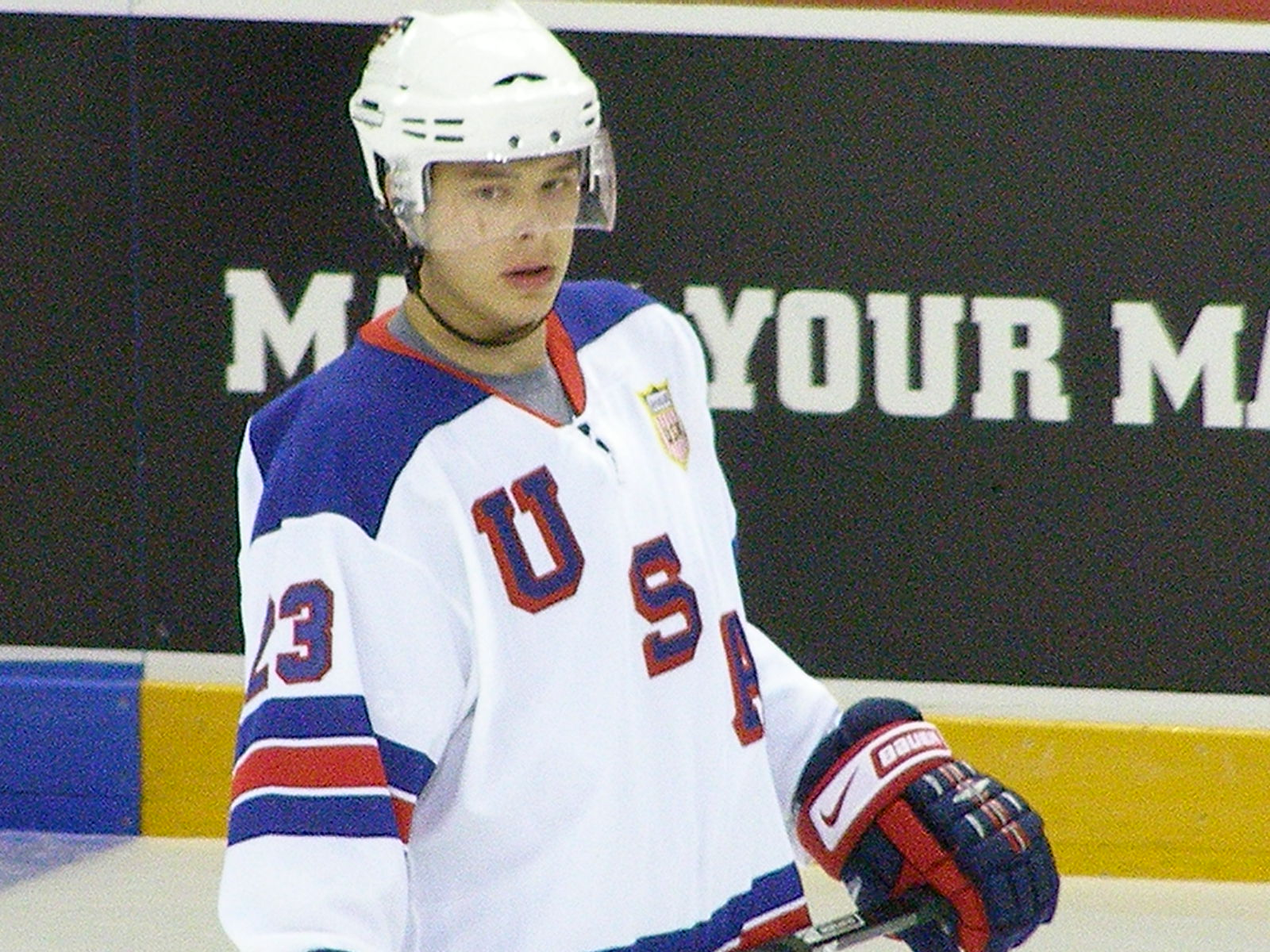
Dustin Brown led all U.S. skaters with seven points in seven games.

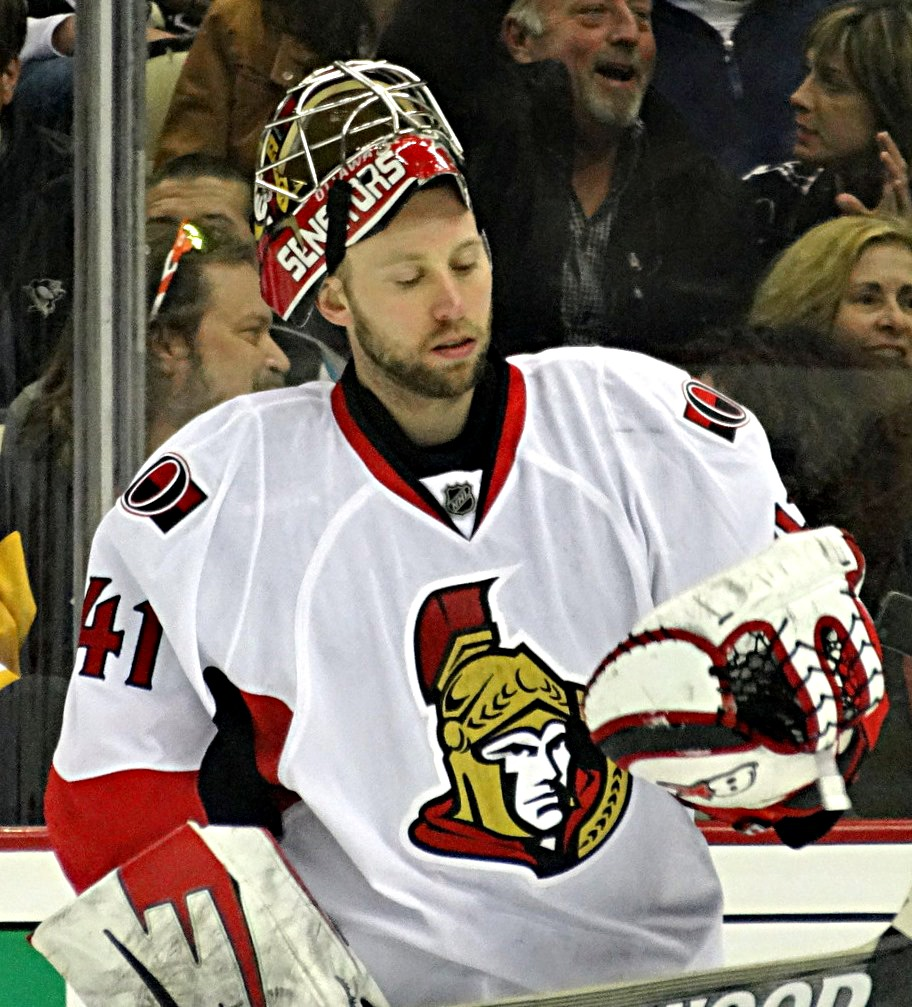
Craig Anderson played the majority of games in goal for the U.S.

=== Skaters ===
Number	Position	Player	Club	GP	G	A	Pts	PIM
41	D	Andrew Alberts	Boston Bruins	7	1	0	1	14
23	F	Dustin Brown	Los Angeles Kings	7	5	2	7	10
6	D	Joe Corvo	Los Angeles Kings	7	0	0	0	0
14	F	Mark Cullen	Chicago Blackhawks	7	1	2	3	0
25	D	Hal Gill	Boston Bruins	7	0	0	0	14
28	F	Adam Hall	Nashville Predators	7	0	0	0	0
9	F	Andy Hilbert	Pittsburgh Penguins	7	0	3	3	10
17	F	Ryan Kesler	Vancouver Canucks	7	0	1	1	0
8	F	Phil Kessel	University of Minnesota	7	1	1	2	2
55	D	Mike Komisarek	Montreal Canadiens	7	0	1	1	4
12	F	Ryan Malone	Pittsburgh Penguins	7	2	2	4	12
34	D	Freddy Meyer	Philadelphia Flyers	7	0	0	0	6
10	F	Patrick O'Sullivan	Houston Aeros	3	1	0	1	0
44	D	Brooks Orpik	Pittsburgh Penguins	7	0	0	0	10
18	F	Richard Park	Vancouver Canucks	7	1	1	2	0
11	F	Marty Reasoner	Boston Bruins	7	0	0	0	8
16	F	James Slater	Atlanta Thrashers	7	0	1	1	2
19	F	Drew Stafford	University of North Dakota	7	0	1	1	0
21	F	Yan Stastny	Boston Bruins	7	1	0	1	2
7	D	Ryan Suter	Nashville Predators	7	1	1	2	10
20	F	R. J. Umberger	Philadelphia Flyers	1	0	0	0	0

=== Goaltenders ===
Number	Player	Club	GP	W	L	T	Min	GA	GAA	SV%	SO
31	Craig Anderson	Chicago Blackhawks	5	3	2	0	280	11	2.36	0.908	1
33	Jason Bacashihua	St. Louis Blues	3	1	2	0	140	5	2.14	0.927	0
30	David McKee	Cornell University	0	–	–	–	–	–	–	–	–
