= Miloslav Gureň =

Czech ice hockey player (born 1976)

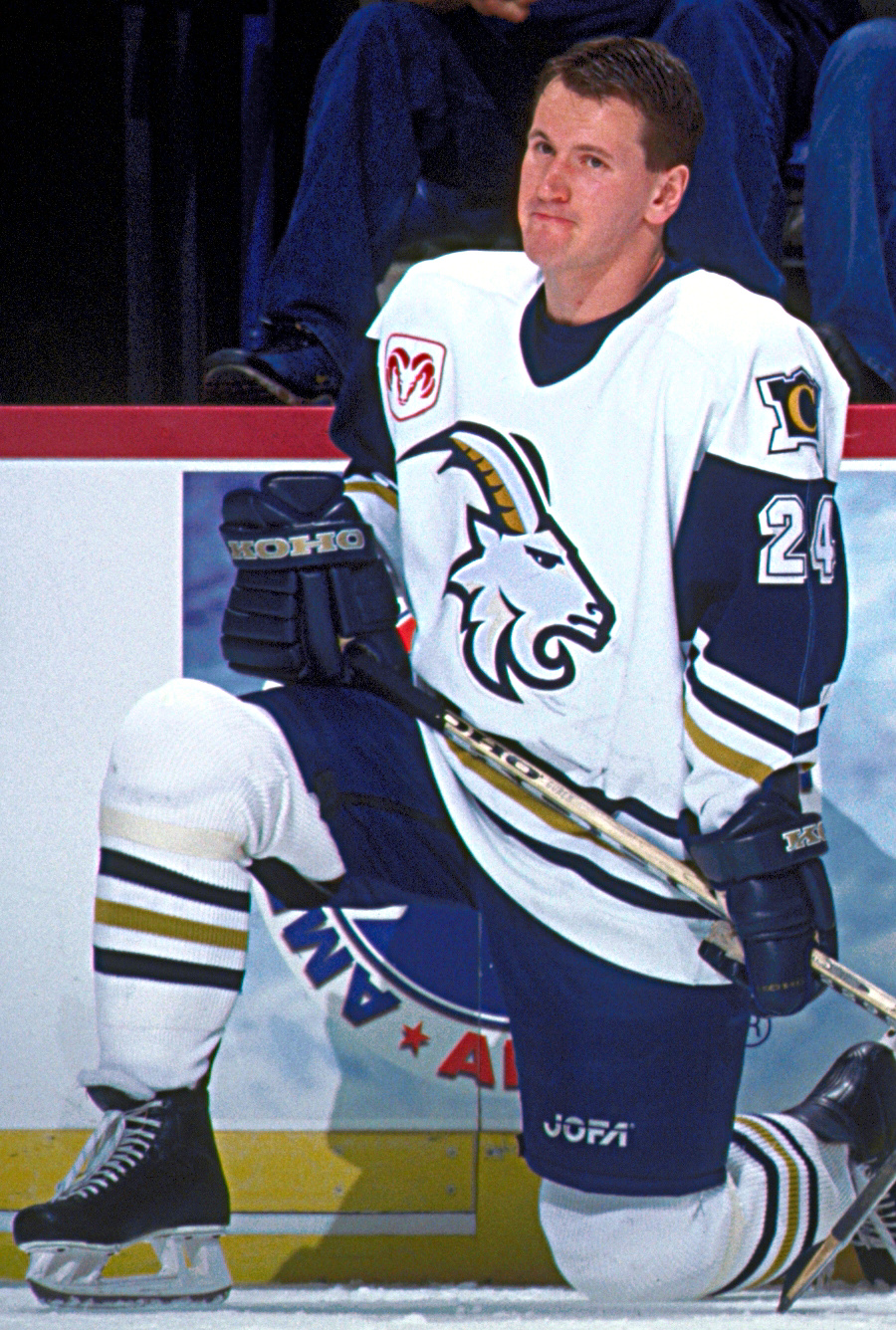
- Born: September 24, 1976 (age 49) Uherský Brod, Czechoslovakia
- Height: 6 ft 2 in (188 cm)
- Weight: 225 lb (102 kg; 16 st 1 lb)
- Position: Defence
- Shot: Left
- Played for: HC Zlín; Montreal Canadiens; HC Oceláři Třinec; CSKA Moscow; Sibir Novosibirsk; HC Litvínov; SG Pontebba; Dragons de Rouen; Eppan/Appiano; FerencvárosiTC; HC Spartak Uherský Brod
- NHL draft: 60th overall, 1995; Montreal Canadiens
- Playing career: 1993–2015

Miloslav Gureň (born September 24, 1976) is a Czech former professional ice hockey defenseman who played 36 games for the Montreal Canadiens in the National Hockey League (NHL).

== Playing career ==
Gureň played as a youth within a professional club, PSG Berani Zlín of the Czech Extraliga. After his second professional season in the ELH in 1994–95, Gureň was selected by the Montreal Canadiens in the third round, 60th overall, of the 1995 NHL entry draft.

Having signed with the Canadiens, Gureň moved to North America before the 1996–97 season, playing with the Canadiens affiliate, the Fredericton Canadiens in the American Hockey League (AHL).

Gureň made his NHL debut with the Canadiens in the 1998–99 season, playing against the New York Rangers at the Molson Centre on October 10, 1998. He appeared in 12 games registering 1 assist. Unable to secure a regular spot on Montreal's blueline, Gureň played the majority of his tenure in the AHL.

After five seasons in North America, Gureň opted to return to Europe, signing with Czech club, HC Oceláři Třinec, for the 2001–02 season. He played 6 seasons in the Russian Superleague with CSKA Moscow and HC Sibir Novosibirsk before returning to the Czech Republic to play out the majority of his career.

Gureň ended his professional career following the 2014–15 season in the Italian Serie A, however, opted to continue playing through to 2019 at the Czech Regional level with a local club, HC Uherské Brod.

== Career statistics ==
=== Regular season and playoffs ===
			Regular season					Playoffs
Season	Team	League	GP	G	A	Pts	PIM	GP	G	A	Pts	PIM
1992–93	HC Zlín	Czech.20	36	7	14	21	10	—	—	—	—	—
1993–94	HC Zlín	ELH	22	1	5	6	6	3	0	0	0	2
1994–95	HC Zlín	ELH	32	3	7	10	12	12	1	0	1	6
1995–96	HC Zlín	ELH	26	1	1	2	8	7	1	2	3	10
1996–97	Fredericton Canadiens	AHL	79	6	26	32	26	—	—	—	—	—
1997–98	Fredericton Canadiens	AHL	78	15	36	51	36	4	1	2	3	0
1998–99	Montreal Canadiens	NHL	12	0	1	1	4	—	—	—	—	—
1998–99	Fredericton Canadiens	AHL	63	5	16	21	24	15	4	7	11	10
1999–00	Montreal Canadiens	NHL	24	1	2	3	12	—	—	—	—	—
1999–00	Quebec Citadelles	AHL	29	5	12	17	16	3	0	0	0	2
2000–01	Quebec Citadelles	AHL	75	11	40	51	24	8	4	2	6	6
2001–02	HC Oceláři Třinec	ELH	52	2	9	11	44	6	1	2	3	8
2002–03	CSKA Moscow	RSL	39	2	7	9	14	—	—	—	—	—
2003–04	Sibir Novosibirsk	RSL	55	7	8	15	26	—	—	—	—	—
2004–05	Sibir Novosibirsk	RSL	30	5	2	7	22	—	—	—	—	—
2005–06	Sibir Novosibirsk	RSL	51	6	9	15	36	4	2	0	2	4
2006–07	Sibir Novosibirsk	RSL	53	1	14	15	80	7	1	1	2	8
2007–08	Sibir Novosibirsk	RSL	56	1	8	9	34	—	—	—	—	—
2008–09	HC Oceláři Třinec	ELH	41	4	11	15	52	5	0	0	0	2
2009–10	HC Litvínov	ELH	44	3	6	9	36	—	—	—	—	—
2009–10	HC Slovan Ústečtí Lvi	Czech.1	3	0	0	0	2	17	1	2	3	10
2010–11	HC Slovan Ústečtí Lvi	Czech.1	30	1	4	5	28	21	1	0	1	10
2011–12	HC Slovan Ústečtí Lvi	Czech.1	41	1	16	17	24	10	1	4	5	2
2012–13	SG Pontebba	ITL	40	6	26	32	56	—	—	—	—	—
2013–14	Dragons de Rouen	FRA	23	3	14	17	20	7	1	0	1	8
2014–15	Eppan/Appiano	ITL	11	2	2	4	10	—	—	—	—	—
2014–15	Ferencvárosi TC	MOL	25	4	7	11	26	—	—	—	—	—
ELH totals			217	14	39	53	158	33	3	4	7	28
NHL totals			36	1	3	4	16	—	—	—	—	—
RSL totals			284	22	48	70	212	11	3	1	4	12

=== International ===
Year	Team	Event	Result	GP	G	A	Pts	PIM
1994	Czech Republic	EJC18	3rd place, bronze medalist(s)	5	1	3	4	2
1995	Czech Republic	WJC	6th	7	0	0	0	4
1996	Czech Republic	WJC	4th	6	0	2	2	2
Junior totals				18	1	5	6	8

== Awards and honours ==
Award	Year
AHL
All-Star Game	2001
Ligue Magnus
Champion (Dragons de Rouen)	2014
