= Luca Felicetti =

Italian ice hockey player

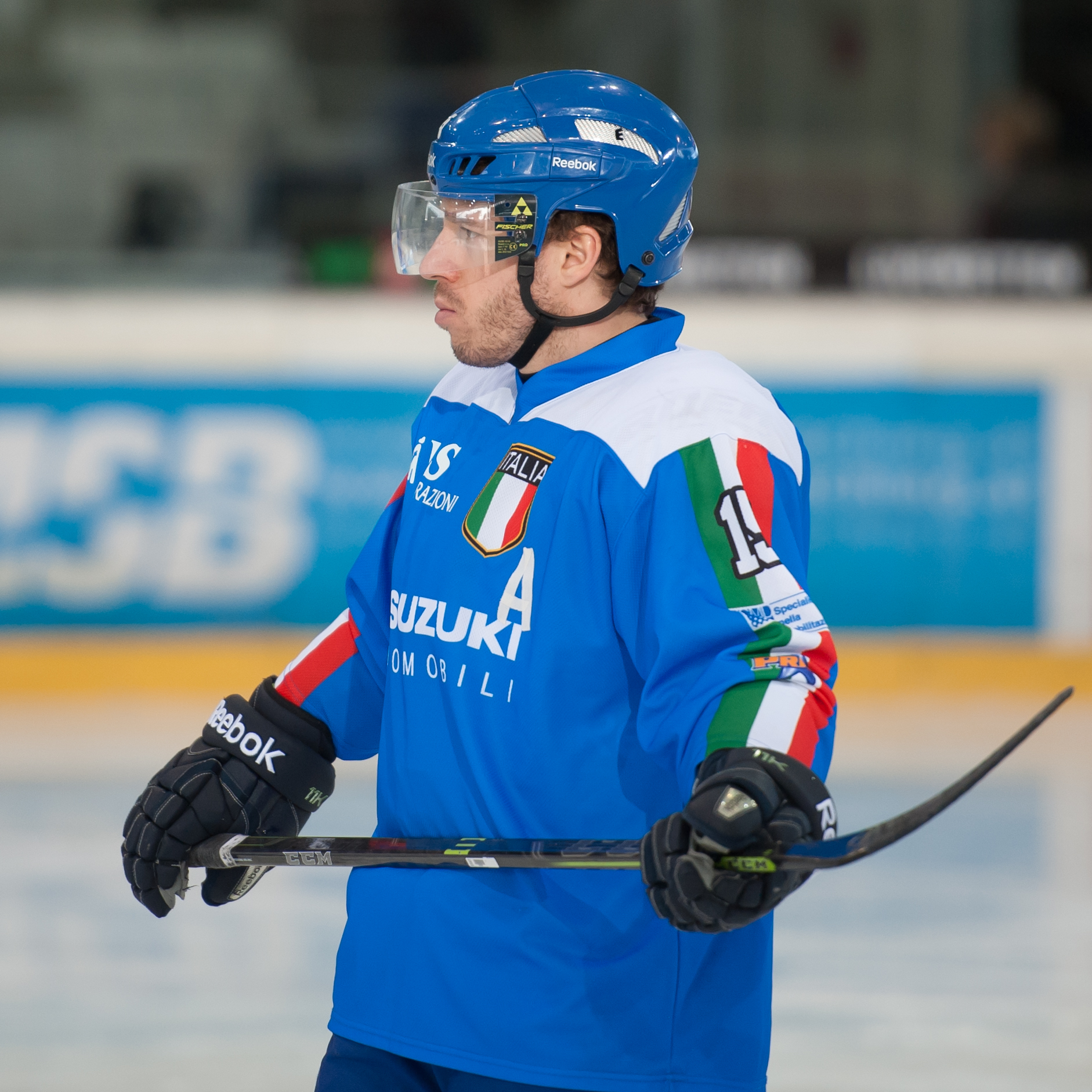
- Born: 17 August 1981 (age 43); Cavalese, Italy
- Height: 5 ft 5 in (165 cm)
- Weight: 165 lb (75 kg; 11 st 11 lb)
- Position: Forward
- Shot: Left
- Played for: HC Fassa; SG Pontebba; HC Valpellice; SG Cortina; Ritten Sport; WSV Sterzing Broncos
- National team: Italy
- Playing career: 1997–2019

Luca Felicetti (born 17 August 1981) is an Italian former professional ice hockey player.

Felicetti played for HC Fassa, SG Pontebba, HC Valpellice, SG Cortina, Ritten Sport and the WSV Sterzing Broncos. Felicetti competed in the 2012 IIHF World Championship as a member of the Italy men's national ice hockey team.
