= 2011–12 Serie A (ice hockey) season =

Italian professional ice hockey season

The 2011–12 Serie A season was the 78th season of the Serie A, the top level of ice hockey in Italy. 10 teams participated in the league, and HC Bolzano won the championship by defeating HC Pustertal in the final.

== First round ==
	Club	GP	W	OTW	OTL	L	GF	GA	Pts
1.	HC Pustertal	36	21	3	4	8	134	84	73
2.	HC Bolzano	36	20	4	2	10	116	79	70
3.	SG Pontebba	36	17	2	4	13	116	94	59
4.	SG Cortina	36	15	4	3	14	107	99	56
5.	HC Alleghe	36	14	5	3	14	111	116	55
6.	Asiago Hockey	36	13	5	4	14	105	108	53
7.	Ritten Sport	36	11	6	4	15	97	110	49
8.	SHC Fassa	36	12	3	4	17	84	108	46
9.	WSV Sterzing Broncos	36	12	2	3	19	83	112	43
10.	HC Valpellice	36	10	1	4	21	98	141	36

== Second round ==
=== Group A ===
	Club	GP	W	OTW	OTL	L	GF	GA	Pts
1.	HC Pustertal	6	4	0	0	2	26	18	48
2.	HC Bolzano	6	3	0	0	3	14	18	44
3.	SG Cortina	6	4	0	0	2	23	16	40
4.	SG Pontebba	6	1	0	0	5	12	23	32

=== Group B ===
	Club	GP	W	OTW	OTL	L	GF	GA	Pts
5.	HC Alleghe	10	6	0	0	4	28	36	45
6.	HC Valpellice	10	6	3	0	1	39	15	42
7.	SHC Fassa	10	4	2	2	2	31	27	41
8.	Asiago Hockey	10	2	2	2	4	22	26	38
9.	Ritten Sport	10	3	0	2	5	18	26	35
10.	WSV Sterzing Broncos	10	1	1	2	6	25	33	28

== Playoffs ==
Quarterfinals
1	HC Pustertal	4
8	Asiago Hockey	0
4	SG Pontebba	2
5	HC Alleghe	4
2	HC Bolzano	4
7	SHC Fassa	0
3	SG Cortina	4
6	HC Valpellice	1

Semifinals
1	HC Pustertal	4
5	HC Alleghe	1
2	HC Bolzano	4
3	SG Cortina	0

Final
1	HC Pustertal	0
2	HC Bolzano	4
