= 2009–10 Serie A (ice hockey) season =

2009–10 Serie A
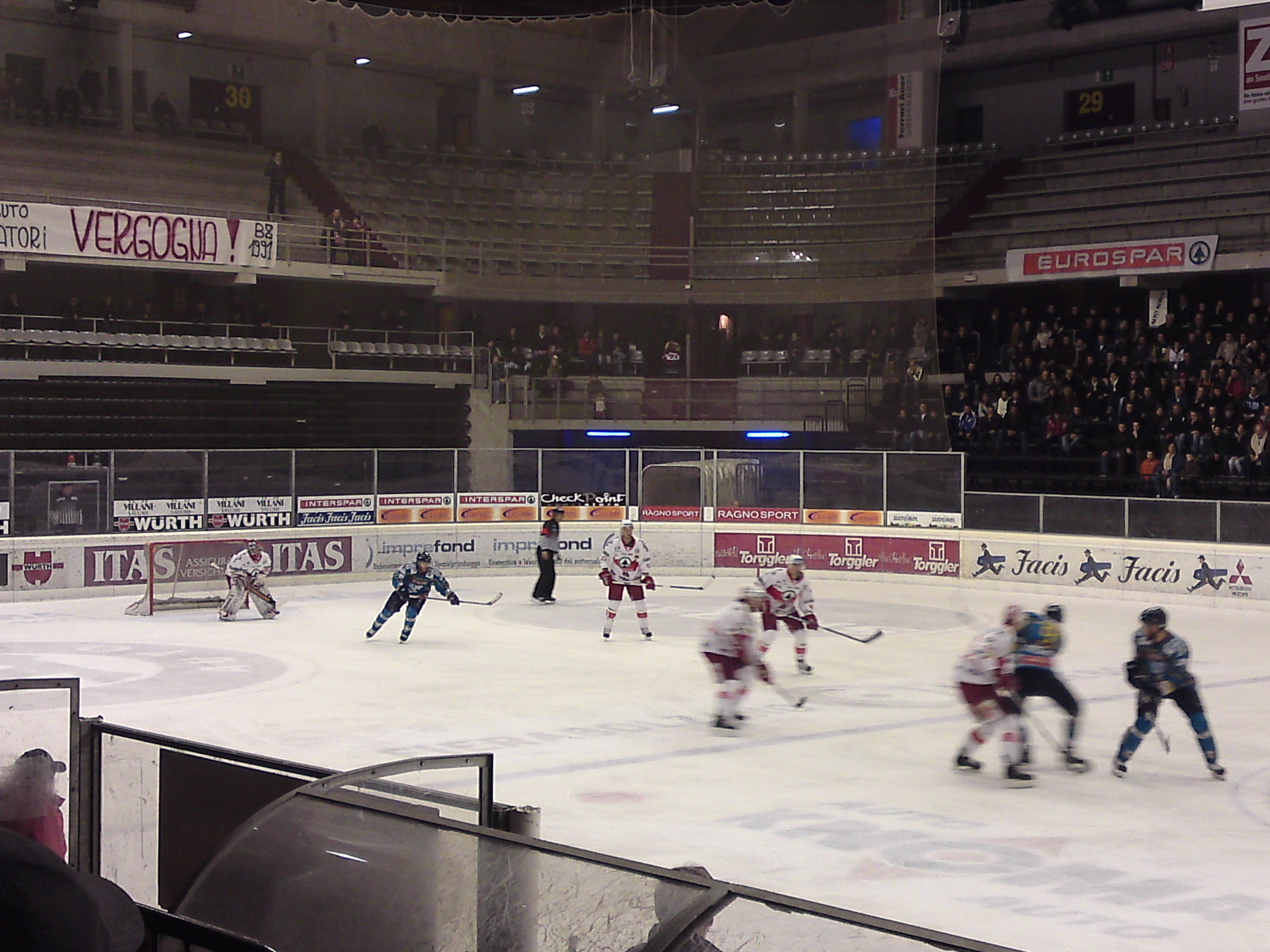
- League: Serie A
- Sport: Ice hockey
- Duration: September 26 – March 2
- Teams: 9

Regular season
- Best record: Ritten Sport
- Runners-up: Valpusteria

Playoffs

Finals
- Champions: Asiago Hockey
- Runners-up: Ritten Sport

Serie A seasons
- ← 2008–09 2010–11 →

The 2009–10 Serie A is the 76th season of ice hockey in Italy since the league's inception in 1925.

== Teams ==
Team	City	Arena	Capacity
HC Alleghe	Alleghe, Veneto	Stadio Alvise De Toni	2,500
Associazione Sportiva Asiago Hockey	Asiago, Veneto	Stadio Odegar	1,975
Hockey Club Bolzano	Bolzano, South Tyrol	Palaonda-Eiswelle	7,220
Sportivi Ghiaccio Cortina	Cortina d'Ampezzo, Veneto	Stadio Olimpico del Ghiaccio	2,700
Sportiva Hockey Club Fassa	Canazei, Trentino	Stadio del Ghiaccio Gianmario Scola	3,500
Sport Ghiaccio Pontebba	Pontebba, Friuli-Venezia Giulia	PalaVuerich	2,000
Sportverein Ritten-Renon	Ritten, South Tyrol	Arena Ritten	1,200
Hockey Club Pustertal-Val Pusteria	Bruneck, South Tyrol	Leitner Solar Arena	2,050
Hockey Club Valpellice	Torre Pellice, Piedmont	Palaghiaccio Olimpico di Torre Pellice	2,500

== Regular season ==
Standings

Team	GP	W	OTW	OTL	L	GF	GA	P
Ritten Sport	40	24	1	5	10	147	114	79
Val Pusteria	40	23	2	2	13	153	113	75
Asiago	40	20	6	3	11	133	109	75
Bolzano	40	19	5	2	14	127	110	69
Pontebba	40	17	4	3	16	137	140	62
Fassa	40	17	1	4	18	93	97	57
Alleghe	40	12	3	4	21	114	150	46
Valpellice	40	11	3	2	24	144	177	41
Cortina	40	9	3	3	25	113	151	36

Legend: GP = Games played; W = Regulation Wins; OTW= Overtime Wins; OTL = Overtime losses; L = Regulation losses; GF = Goals for; GA = Goals against; P = Points

Val Pusteria were placed above Asiago as a result of head-to-head competition during the regular season.

== Playoffs ==
Quarterfinals
1	Ritten Sport	4
8	HC Valpellice	1
4	HC Bolzano	4
5	SG Pontebba	3
2	HC Pustertal	4
7	HC Alleghe	0
3	Asiago Hockey	4
6	SHC Fassa	2

Semifinals
1	Ritten Sport	4
4	HC Bolzano	2
2	HC Pustertal	2
3	Asiago Hockey	4

Finals
1	Ritten Sport	0
3	Asiago Hockey	4
