= 2014–15 Serie A (ice hockey) season =

Italian professional ice hockey season

The 2014–15 Serie A season was the 81st season of the Serie A, the top level of ice hockey in Italy. 12 teams participated in the league, and Asiago Hockey won the championship. Ritten Sport won the League Cup.

== Regular season ==
	Club	GP	W	OTW	OTL	L	GF–GA	Pts
1.	Asiago Hockey	38	25	5	1	7	159:84	86
2.	HC Pustertal	38	24	4	2	8	150:74	82
3.	Ritten Sport	38	23	2	8	5	132:82	81
4.	Hockey Milano Rossoblu	38	18	4	9	7	135:109	69
5.	HC Valpellice	38	18	4	0	16	137:121	62
7.	WSV Sterzing Broncos	38	15	6	3	14	115:158	60
7.	HC Eppan Pirates	38	13	4	2	19	101:206	49
8.	SG Cortina	38	12	4	4	18	109:110	48
9.	HC Neumarkt-Egna	38	13	1	6	18	102:134	47
10.	HC Gherdëina	38	10	4	3	21	99:134	41
11.	HC Fassa	38	9	2	4	23	83:148	35
12.	SV Kaltern	38	7	1	1	29	81:168	24
