= 2013–14 Elite.A season =

Italian ice hockey league season

The 2013–14 Elite A season was the 80th season of the Serie A, the top level of ice hockey in Italy. Eight teams participated in the league, and Ritten Sport won the championship. HC Pustertal claimed the League Cup.

== Regular season ==
	Club	GP	W	OTW	OTL	L	GF–GA	Pts
1.	Ritten Sport	42	29	2	1	10	162:101	92
2.	Asiago Hockey	42	26	3	3	10	171:113	87
3.	HC Pustertal	42	23	1	4	14	139:121	75
4.	HC Valpellice	42	22	2	1	16	182:147	71
5.	SG Cortina	42	17	5	2	18	126:127	63
6.	Hockey Milano Rossoblu	42	15	3	1	23	138:160	52
7.	WSV Sterzing Broncos	42	12	1	6	23	115:158	44
8.	SHC Fassa	42	6	1	0	35	101:206	20

== Playoffs ==
=== First and second round ===
First round
1	Ritten Sport	3
4	HC Valpellice	1
5	SG Cortina	3
8	SHC Fassa	0

Second round
4	HC Valpellice	1
5	SG Cortina	2

First round
6	Hockey Milano Rossoblu	1
7	WSV Sterzing Broncos	3
2	Asiago Hockey	1
3	HC Pustertal	3

Second round
2	Asiago Hockey	2
7	WSV Sterzing Broncos	0

Ritten Sport and HC Pustertal, with their victories, qualified for the playoff semifinals as well as the League Cup, while Asiago Hockey and HC Valpellice played in the second round against the winner of the lower group for the two remaining spots in the semifinals.

=== League Cup ===
League Cup
1	Ritten Sport	0
3	HC Pustertal	2

=== Semifinals and Final ===
Semifinals
3	HC Pustertal	4
5	SG Cortina	0
1	Ritten Sport	4
2	Asiago Hockey	1

Final
3	HC Pustertal	2
1	Ritten Sport	4
