= 2012–13 Serie A (ice hockey) season =

Ice hockey season

The 2012–13 Serie A season was the 79th season of the Serie A, the top level of ice hockey in Italy. 10 teams participated in the league, and Asiago Hockey won the championship. SG Pontebba was relegated to the Serie A2.

== First round ==
	Club	GP	W	OTW	OTL	L	GF	GA	Pts
1.	HC Pustertal	36	25	1	1	9	141	88	78
2.	HC Bolzano	36	23	2	3	8	123	67	76
3.	Ritten Sport	36	20	3	5	8	131	91	71
4.	HC Alleghe	36	15	9	4	8	112	81	67
5.	HC Valpellice	36	16	4	6	10	121	111	62
6.	Asiago Hockey	36	13	7	4	12	124	110	57
7.	Hockey Milano Rossoblu	36	11	5	3	17	88	107	46
8.	SG Cortina	36	11	2	6	17	105	114	43
9.	SHC Fassa	36	7	3	0	26	79	148	27
10.	SG Pontebba	36	3	0	4	29	67	174	13

== Second round ==
=== Group A ===
	Club	GP	W	OTW	OTL	L	GF	GA	Pts
1.	Ritten Sport	8	5	1	1	1	30	22	53
2.	HC Pustertal	8	4	0	1	3	24	21	52
3.	HC Bolzano	8	3	1	0	4	23	21	49
4.	HC Alleghe	8	2	2	1	3	25	27	44
5.	HC Valpellice	8	2	0	1	5	24	35	38

=== Group B ===
	Club	GP	W	OTW	OTL	L	GF	GA	Pts
6.	Asiago Hockey	8	5	0	1	2	30	16	44
7.	Hockey Milano Rossoblu	8	5	0	0	3	23	16	38
8.	SG Cortina	8	5	1	0	2	33	22	38
9.	SHC Fassa	8	3	1	1	3	26	28	25
10.	SG Pontebba	8	0	0	0	8	15	45	6

== Playoffs ==
Quarterfinals
4	HC Alleghe	2
5	HC Valpellice	4
1	Ritten Sport	3
8	SG Cortina	4
2	HC Pustertal	4
7	Hockey Milano Rossoblu	2
3	HC Bolzano	2
6	Asiago Hockey	4

Semifinals
5	HC Valpellice	4
8	SG Cortina	1
2	HC Pustertal	0
6	Asiago Hockey	4

Final
5	HC Valpellice	1
6	Asiago Hockey	4

== Playouts ==
- SHC Fassa - SG Pontebba 4:0 (7:1, 2:0, 2:1, 4:2)
