= Florian Ramoser =

Italian ice hockey player

Personal information
- Nationality: Italian
- Born: 7 October 1979 (age 45); Bolzano, Italy

Sport
- Sport: Ice hockey

Florian Ramoser (born 7 October 1979) is an Italian ice hockey player. He competed in the men's tournament at the 2006 Winter Olympics.
