= Mickey Goulet =

Canadian ice hockey coach

Biographical details
- Born: September 13, 1947 (age 79); Montreal, Quebec, Canada

Playing career
- 1966–1969: New Hampshire
- 1970–1972: Toledo Hornets

Coaching career (HC unless noted)
- 1973–1974: Nasson
- 1974–1977: New England
- 1977–1989: Colby
- 1989–2003: Ottawa

Michel "Mickey" Goulet (born September 13, 1947) was the head coach for the Italy men's national ice hockey team from 2003 to 2008.

Goulet played college ice hockey for the New Hampshire Wildcats, then played professionally for the Toledo Hornets of the International Hockey League. He earned his undergraduate degree from the University of New Hampshire and a master's degree from Ohio University.

Goulet began his coaching career at Nasson College. He then spent three seasons at New England College. From 1977 to 1989, he was the head coach at Colby College, where he led the Mules to a 126–145–10 record and seven appearances in the ECAC 2 tournament. From 1989 to 2003, he was the coach of the University of Ottawa Gee-Gee's.

From 2003 to 2008, Goulet was the head coach of the Italy men's national ice hockey team. From 2008 to 2009, he was the coach of Italy's U18 and U20 teams.
