= HC Valpellice =

- City: Torre Pellice (TO), Piedmont, Italy
- League: Serie A
- Home arena: Palaghiaccio Olimpico (capacity: 2,500)
- Head coach: Tom Barrasso
- Website: www.hcvalpellice.it

Franchise history
- 1934–1957: Valpellice Sporting Club
- 1962–1992: US Valpellice

Championships
- Coppa Italia: 2013

HC Valpellice Bulldogs, nicknamed "La Valpe", is a professional ice hockey team in Torre Pellice, near Turin, Italy. The team plays in the country's top division, Serie A. Serie A is also sponsored by Reebok, which provides free equipment and sportswear to the players. Their current head coach is former NHL goaltender Tom Barrasso.

== History ==
The region of Piedmont has a long association with winter sports due its proximity to the Alps and Valpellice Sporting Club was founded in 1934 as one of the earliest winter sports clubs in the region. It folded in 1957 when its main sponsors stopped funding. The club was restarted in 1962 under the name U.S. Valpellice in Serie C, the bottom rung of the hockey league. They won promotion to Serie B and then Serie A, the top flight, and enjoyed seven seasons during the 1970s. During the 1983–84, it was relegated to Serie B. The club's decline in fortunes continued with the team facing relegation to Serie C and ongoing tussles with the government bureaucrats over arena renovations. It again folded in 2000. Instead, the Presidents of Valpellice and provincial rivals HC Torino founding All Stars Piemonte, a move which proved to be unpopular with fans. The current HC Valpellice was refounded in 2003. In 2013 and 2016 they won the Coppa Italia.

== Arena ==
Valpellice plays at the multipurpose Giordio Cotta Morandini Olympic Ice Arena, which was constructed from 2003 and 2006 after a flood partially damaged the old arena several years prior. It was not chosen as a venue for the 2006 Winter Olympics hosted in Turin, with the Palasport and the Torino Esposizioni being chosen to co-host ice hockey events.
