= SG Pontebba =

Defunct Italian ice hockey team

- Sport: Ice hockey
- Founded: 1986
- Folded: 2014
- League: Serie A
- Location: Pontebba, Italy
- Arena: PalaVuerich
- Championships: 1

Sport Ghiaccio Pontebba was represented by Aquile Friuli-Venezia Giulia, the Pontebba region's flagship ice hockey team. It played its home games at the PalaVuerich arena in Pontebba, Italy. The team was a member of the Serie A and won the 2008 Italian Cup.
