= Ice hockey at the 2006 Winter Olympics – Men's team rosters =

These are the team rosters of the nations that participated in the men's ice hockey tournament of the 2006 Winter Olympics. Each team was permitted a roster of 20 skaters and three goaltenders.

== Participating teams ==
=== Canada ===
The following is the Canadian roster for the men's ice hockey tournament at the 2006 Winter Olympics.

Head coach: Pat Quinn

Assistant coaches: Wayne Fleming, Marc Habscheid, Ken Hitchcock, Jacques Martin

No.	Pos.	Name	Height	Weight	Birthdate	Team
1	G	Roberto Luongo	191 cm (6 ft 3 in)	93 kg (205 lb)	April 19, 1979 (aged 26)	(United States) Florida Panthers
3	D	Jay Bouwmeester	193 cm (6 ft 4 in)	88 kg (194 lb)	September 7, 1983 (aged 22)	(United States) Florida Panthers
4	D	Rob Blake (A)	193 cm (6 ft 4 in)	102 kg (225 lb)	December 10, 1969 (aged 36)	(United States) Colorado Avalanche
6	D	Wade Redden	188 cm (6 ft 2 in)	95 kg (209 lb)	June 12, 1977 (aged 28)	(Canada) Ottawa Senators
9	F	Shane Doan	188 cm (6 ft 2 in)	98 kg (216 lb)	October 10, 1976 (aged 29)	(United States) Phoenix Coyotes
12	F	Jarome Iginla (A)	185 cm (6 ft 1 in)	95 kg (209 lb)	July 1, 1977 (aged 28)	(Canada) Calgary Flames
14	F	Todd Bertuzzi	191 cm (6 ft 3 in)	111 kg (245 lb)	February 2, 1975 (aged 31)	(Canada) Vancouver Canucks
15	F	Dany Heatley	191 cm (6 ft 3 in)	98 kg (216 lb)	January 21, 1981 (aged 25)	(Canada) Ottawa Senators
21	F	Simon Gagné (A)	183 cm (6 ft 0 in)	84 kg (185 lb)	February 29, 1980 (aged 25)	(United States) Philadelphia Flyers
24	D	Bryan McCabe	188 cm (6 ft 2 in)	100 kg (220 lb)	June 8, 1975 (aged 30)	(Canada) Toronto Maple Leafs
26	F	Martin St. Louis	175 cm (5 ft 9 in)	84 kg (185 lb)	June 18, 1975 (aged 30)	(United States) Tampa Bay Lightning
28	D	Robyn Regehr	191 cm (6 ft 3 in)	102 kg (225 lb)	April 19, 1980 (aged 25)	(Canada) Calgary Flames
30	G	Martin Brodeur	188 cm (6 ft 2 in)	95 kg (209 lb)	May 6, 1972 (aged 33)	(United States) New Jersey Devils
33	F	Kris Draper	178 cm (5 ft 10 in)	86 kg (190 lb)	May 24, 1971 (aged 34)	(United States) Detroit Red Wings
35	G	Marty Turco	180 cm (5 ft 11 in)	83 kg (183 lb)	August 13, 1975 (aged 30)	(United States) Dallas Stars
39	F	Brad Richards	185 cm (6 ft 1 in)	90 kg (200 lb)	May 2, 1980 (aged 25)	(United States) Tampa Bay Lightning
40	F	Vincent Lecavalier	193 cm (6 ft 4 in)	93 kg (205 lb)	April 21, 1980 (aged 25)	(United States) Tampa Bay Lightning
44	D	Chris Pronger (A)	198 cm (6 ft 6 in)	100 kg (220 lb)	October 10, 1974 (aged 31)	(Canada) Edmonton Oilers
52	D	Adam Foote	188 cm (6 ft 2 in)	98 kg (216 lb)	July 10, 1971 (aged 34)	(United States) Columbus Blue Jackets
61	F	Rick Nash	193 cm (6 ft 4 in)	93 kg (205 lb)	June 16, 1984 (aged 21)	(United States) Columbus Blue Jackets
91	F	Joe Sakic (C)	180 cm (5 ft 11 in)	88 kg (194 lb)	July 7, 1969 (aged 36)	(United States) Colorado Avalanche
94	F	Ryan Smyth	185 cm (6 ft 1 in)	86 kg (190 lb)	February 21, 1976 (aged 29)	(Canada) Edmonton Oilers
97	F	Joe Thornton	193 cm (6 ft 4 in)	102 kg (225 lb)	July 2, 1979 (aged 26)	(United States) San Jose Sharks

Defencemen Scott Niedermayer and Ed Jovanovski were originally selected, but due to injuries were replaced by Jay Bouwmeester and Bryan McCabe, respectively. Dan Boyle took McCabe's previous spot as a reserve. Defenceman Dan Boyle and forwards Jason Spezza and Eric Staal were selected as "reserves" in case of injury before the tournament began.

=== Czech Republic ===
The following is the Czech roster for the men's ice hockey tournament at the 2006 Winter Olympics.

Head coach: Alois Hadamczik

Assistant coaches: Mojmír Trličík, Ondrej Weissmann

No.	Pos.	Name	Height	Weight	Birthdate	Team
3	D	Marek Židlický	5 ft 10 in (178 cm)	190 lb (86 kg)	February 3, 1977 (aged 29)	(United States) Nashville Predators
6	D	Jaroslav Špaček	5 ft 11 in (180 cm)	203 lb (92 kg)	February 11, 1974 (aged 32)	(Canada) Edmonton Oilers
8	D	Marek Malík	6 ft 4 in (193 cm)	236 lb (107 kg)	June 25, 1975 (aged 30)	(United States) New York Rangers
9	F	David Výborný (A)	5 ft 10 in (178 cm)	183 lb (83 kg)	January 25, 1975 (aged 31)	(United States) Columbus Blue Jackets
12	D	František Kaberle	6 ft 1 in (185 cm)	190 lb (86 kg)	November 8, 1973 (aged 32)	(United States) Carolina Hurricanes
13	D	Pavel Kubina (A)	6 ft 4 in (193 cm)	243 lb (110 kg)	April 15, 1977 (aged 28)	(United States) Tampa Bay Lightning
15	D	Tomáš Kaberle	6 ft 1 in (185 cm)	212 lb (96 kg)	March 2, 1978 (aged 27)	(Canada) Toronto Maple Leafs
16	F	Petr Čajánek	5 ft 11 in (180 cm)	185 lb (84 kg)	August 18, 1975 (aged 30)	(United States) St. Louis Blues
17	D	Filip Kuba	6 ft 4 in (193 cm)	229 lb (104 kg)	December 29, 1976 (aged 29)	(United States) Minnesota Wild
20	F	Robert Lang (C)	6 ft 3 in (191 cm)	212 lb (96 kg)	December 19, 1970 (aged 35)	(United States) Detroit Red Wings
22	F	Aleš Kotalík	6 ft 1 in (185 cm)	227 lb (103 kg)	December 23, 1978 (aged 27)	(United States) Buffalo Sabres
23	F	Milan Hejduk	6 ft 0 in (183 cm)	192 lb (87 kg)	February 14, 1976 (aged 30)	(United States) Colorado Avalanche
26	F	Martin Ručinský	6 ft 2 in (188 cm)	209 lb (95 kg)	March 11, 1971 (aged 34)	(United States) New York Rangers
28	F	Martin Straka	5 ft 9 in (175 cm)	174 lb (79 kg)	September 3, 1972 (aged 33)	(United States) New York Rangers
29	G	Tomáš Vokoun	6 ft 0 in (183 cm)	216 lb (98 kg)	July 2, 1976 (aged 29)	(United States) Nashville Predators
33	G	Milan Hnilička	6 ft 1 in (185 cm)	185 lb (84 kg)	June 25, 1973 (aged 32)	(Czech Republic) Bílí Tygři Liberec
38	F	Jan Bulis	6 ft 0 in (183 cm)	209 lb (95 kg)	March 13, 1978 (aged 27)	(Canada) Montreal Canadiens
39	G	Dominik Hašek	6 ft 0 in (183 cm)	165 lb (75 kg)	January 29, 1965 (aged 41)	(Canada) Ottawa Senators
40	F	Václav Prospal	6 ft 2 in (188 cm)	198 lb (90 kg)	February 17, 1975 (aged 30)	(United States) Tampa Bay Lightning
62	F	Patrik Eliáš	6 ft 1 in (185 cm)	190 lb (86 kg)	April 13, 1976 (aged 29)	(United States) New Jersey Devils
68	F	Jaromír Jágr	6 ft 3 in (191 cm)	230 lb (100 kg)	February 15, 1972 (aged 34)	(United States) New York Rangers
72	G	Dušan Salfický	6 ft 1 in (185 cm)	185 lb (84 kg)	March 28, 1972 (aged 33)	(Russia) Khimik Mytischi
83	F	Aleš Hemský	6 ft 0 in (183 cm)	176 lb (80 kg)	August 13, 1983 (aged 22)	(Canada) Edmonton Oilers
85	F	Rostislav Olesz	6 ft 1 in (185 cm)	214 lb (97 kg)	October 10, 1985 (aged 20)	(United States) Florida Panthers
91	F	Martin Erat	5 ft 10 in (178 cm)	198 lb (90 kg)	August 29, 1981 (aged 24)	(United States) Nashville Predators

=== Finland ===
The following is the Finnish roster for the men's ice hockey tournament at the 2006 Winter Olympics.

Head coach: Erkka Westerlund

Assistant coaches: Risto Dufva, Hannu Virta

No.	Pos.	Name	Height	Weight	Birthdate	Team
3	D	Petteri Nummelin	5 ft 10 in (178 cm)	194 lb (88 kg)	November 25, 1972 (aged 33)	(Switzerland) HC Lugano
4	D	Kimmo Timonen (A)	5 ft 10 in (178 cm)	194 lb (88 kg)	March 18, 1975 (aged 30)	(United States) Nashville Predators
5	D	Lasse Kukkonen	6 ft 0 in (183 cm)	187 lb (85 kg)	October 18, 1981 (aged 24)	(Finland) Kärpät
6	D	Sami Salo	6 ft 3 in (191 cm)	216 lb (98 kg)	March 22, 1974 (aged 31)	(Canada) Vancouver Canucks
7	D	Aki Berg	6 ft 4 in (193 cm)	214 lb (97 kg)	July 28, 1977 (aged 28)	(Canada) Toronto Maple Leafs
8	F	Teemu Selänne	6 ft 0 in (183 cm)	201 lb (91 kg)	July 3, 1970 (aged 35)	(United States) Mighty Ducks of Anaheim
10	F	Ville Nieminen	6 ft 0 in (183 cm)	207 lb (94 kg)	April 6, 1977 (aged 28)	(United States) New York Rangers
11	F	Saku Koivu (C)	5 ft 10 in (178 cm)	181 lb (82 kg)	November 23, 1974 (aged 31)	(Canada) Montreal Canadiens
12	F	Olli Jokinen	6 ft 2 in (188 cm)	209 lb (95 kg)	December 5, 1978 (aged 27)	(United States) Florida Panthers
14	F	Niklas Hagman	6 ft 0 in (183 cm)	205 lb (93 kg)	December 5, 1979 (aged 26)	(United States) Dallas Stars
16	F	Ville Peltonen	5 ft 11 in (180 cm)	187 lb (85 kg)	March 24, 1973 (aged 32)	(Switzerland) HC Lugano
21	F	Mikko Koivu	6 ft 2 in (188 cm)	214 lb (97 kg)	March 12, 1983 (aged 22)	(United States) Minnesota Wild
24	F	Antti Laaksonen	6 ft 0 in (183 cm)	181 lb (82 kg)	October 3, 1973 (aged 32)	(United States) Colorado Avalanche
25	F	Jukka Hentunen	5 ft 10 in (178 cm)	198 lb (90 kg)	May 3, 1974 (aged 31)	(Switzerland) HC Lugano
26	F	Jere Lehtinen	6 ft 0 in (183 cm)	194 lb (88 kg)	June 24, 1973 (aged 32)	(United States) Dallas Stars
27	D	Teppo Numminen (A)	6 ft 1 in (185 cm)	198 lb (90 kg)	July 3, 1968 (aged 37)	(United States) Buffalo Sabres
30	G	Fredrik Norrena	6 ft 0 in (183 cm)	190 lb (86 kg)	November 29, 1973 (aged 32)	(Sweden) Linköping HC
31	G	Antero Niittymäki	6 ft 1 in (185 cm)	190 lb (86 kg)	June 18, 1980 (aged 25)	(United States) Philadelphia Flyers
32	D	Toni Lydman	6 ft 1 in (185 cm)	201 lb (91 kg)	September 25, 1975 (aged 30)	(United States) Buffalo Sabres
33	G	Niklas Bäckström	6 ft 2 in (188 cm)	192 lb (87 kg)	February 13, 1978 (aged 28)	(Finland) Kärpät
36	F	Jussi Jokinen	6 ft 0 in (183 cm)	192 lb (87 kg)	April 1, 1983 (aged 22)	(United States) Dallas Stars
37	F	Jarkko Ruutu	6 ft 1 in (185 cm)	203 lb (92 kg)	August 23, 1975 (aged 30)	(Canada) Vancouver Canucks
39	F	Niko Kapanen	5 ft 10 in (178 cm)	176 lb (80 kg)	April 29, 1978 (aged 27)	(United States) Dallas Stars
77	D	Antti-Jussi Niemi	6 ft 1 in (185 cm)	187 lb (85 kg)	September 29, 1977 (aged 28)	(Sweden) Frölunda HC

=== Germany ===
The following is the German roster for the men's ice hockey tournament at the 2006 Winter Olympics.

Head coach: Uwe Krupp

Assistant coach: Ernst Höfner

No.	Pos.	Name	Height	Weight	Birthdate	Team
5	D	Robert Leask	6 ft 2 in (188 cm)	205 lb (93 kg)	June 9, 1971 (aged 34)	(Germany) Eisbären Berlin
7	D	Sashca Goc	6 ft 2 in (188 cm)	227 lb (103 kg)	April 14, 1979 (aged 26)	(Germany) Hannover Scorpions
10	D	Christian Ehrhoff	6 ft 2 in (188 cm)	201 lb (91 kg)	July 6, 1982 (aged 23)	(United States) San Jose Sharks
11	F	Sven Felski	5 ft 11 in (180 cm)	168 lb (76 kg)	November 18, 1974 (aged 31)	(Germany) Eisbären Berlin
13	D	Christoph Schubert	6 ft 3 in (191 cm)	236 lb (107 kg)	February 5, 1982 (aged 24)	(Canada) Ottawa Senators
15	D	Stefan Schauer	6 ft 1 in (185 cm)	187 lb (85 kg)	January 12, 1983 (aged 23)	(Germany) Nürnberg Ice Tigers
16	F	Stefan Ustorf (C)	5 ft 11 in (180 cm)	194 lb (88 kg)	January 3, 1974 (aged 32)	(Germany) Eisbären Berlin
26	F	Daniel Kreutzer	5 ft 9 in (175 cm)	192 lb (87 kg)	October 23, 1979 (aged 26)	(Germany) DEG Metro Stars
29	F	Alexander Barta	5 ft 10 in (178 cm)	183 lb (83 kg)	February 2, 1983 (aged 23)	(Germany) Hamburg Freezers
31	D	Andreas Renz	6 ft 0 in (183 cm)	207 lb (94 kg)	June 12, 1977 (aged 28)	(Germany) Kölner Haie
32	F	Tomas Martinec	6 ft 0 in (183 cm)	190 lb (86 kg)	March 5, 1976 (aged 29)	(Germany) Nürnberg Ice Tigers
34	F	Eduard Lewandowski	6 ft 2 in (188 cm)	203 lb (92 kg)	September 7, 1980 (aged 25)	(Germany) Kölner Haie
37	G	Olaf Kölzig	6 ft 3 in (191 cm)	225 lb (102 kg)	April 6, 1970 (aged 35)	(United States) Washington Capitals
40	G	Thomas Greiss	6 ft 2 in (188 cm)	218 lb (99 kg)	January 29, 1986 (aged 20)	(Germany) Kölner Haie
46	F	Florian Busch	6 ft 2 in (188 cm)	196 lb (89 kg)	January 2, 1985 (aged 21)	(Germany) Eisbären Berlin
49	F	Klaus Kathan	6 ft 0 in (183 cm)	187 lb (85 kg)	January 7, 1977 (aged 29)	(Germany) DEG Metro Stars
52	D	Alexander Sulzer	6 ft 2 in (188 cm)	207 lb (94 kg)	May 30, 1984 (aged 21)	(Germany) DEG Metro Stars
54	F	Sebastian Furchner	5 ft 9 in (175 cm)	185 lb (84 kg)	May 3, 1982 (aged 23)	(Germany) Kölner Haie
57	F	Marcel Goc	6 ft 0 in (183 cm)	203 lb (92 kg)	August 24, 1983 (aged 22)	(United States) San Jose Sharks
58	D	Lasse Kopitz	6 ft 3 in (191 cm)	198 lb (90 kg)	May 29, 1980 (aged 25)	(Germany) Kölner Haie
72	F	Petr Fical (A)	5 ft 10 in (178 cm)	181 lb (82 kg)	September 23, 1977 (aged 28)	(Germany) Nürnberg Ice Tigers
73	F	Tino Boos	6 ft 0 in (183 cm)	187 lb (85 kg)	April 10, 1975 (aged 30)	(Germany) Kölner Haie
80	G	Robert Müller	5 ft 8 in (173 cm)	187 lb (85 kg)	June 25, 1980 (aged 25)	(Germany) Krefeld Pinguine
84	D	Dennis Seidenberg	6 ft 0 in (183 cm)	198 lb (90 kg)	June 18, 1981 (aged 24)	(United States) Phoenix Coyotes

=== Italy ===
The following is the Italian roster for the men's ice hockey tournament at the 2006 Winter Olympics.

Head coach: (Canada) Michel Goulet

Assistant coaches: (Canada) Ron Ivany, Fabio Polloni

No.	Pos.	Name	Height	Weight	Birthdate	Team
2	F	Stefan Zisser	5 ft 7 in (170 cm)	185 lb (84 kg)	March 6, 1980 (aged 25)	(Italy) HC Bolzano
3	D	Carter Trevisani	6 ft 1 in (185 cm)	198 lb (90 kg)	June 15, 1982 (aged 23)	(Italy) Asiago
6	D	Michele Strazzabosco (A)	6 ft 4 in (193 cm)	223 lb (101 kg)	February 6, 1976 (aged 30)	(Italy) Milano
7	D	Bob Nardella	5 ft 8 in (173 cm)	170 lb (77 kg)	February 2, 1968 (aged 38)	(United States) Rockford IceHogs
8	D	Florian Ramoser	6 ft 2 in (188 cm)	198 lb (90 kg)	October 7, 1979 (aged 26)	(Italy) HC Bolzano
9	F	Giorgio De Bettin	5 ft 9 in (175 cm)	185 lb (84 kg)	August 7, 1972 (aged 33)	(Italy) Cortina
10	F	Giulio Scandella	6 ft 0 in (183 cm)	183 lb (83 kg)	September 18, 1983 (aged 22)	(Italy) Asiago
11	D	Andrè Signoretti	5 ft 9 in (175 cm)	190 lb (86 kg)	January 16, 1979 (aged 27)	(Italy) Cortina
14	D	Carlo Lorenzi	5 ft 10 in (178 cm)	170 lb (77 kg)	September 2, 1974 (aged 31)	(Italy) Alleghe
16	F	John Parco	6 ft 0 in (183 cm)	192 lb (87 kg)	August 25, 1971 (aged 34)	(Italy) Asiago
17	F	Anthony Iob	6 ft 0 in (183 cm)	205 lb (93 kg)	January 2, 1971 (aged 35)	(Austria) EC KAC
21	F	Giuseppe Busillo (C)	6 ft 5 in (196 cm)	212 lb (96 kg)	May 13, 1970 (aged 35)	(Italy) Milano
22	F	Stefano Margoni	6 ft 0 in (183 cm)	181 lb (82 kg)	May 12, 1975 (aged 30)	(Italy) HC Bolzano
24	F	Mario Chitaroni (A)	5 ft 7 in (170 cm)	176 lb (80 kg)	June 11, 1967 (aged 38)	(Italy) Milano
26	D	Armin Helfer	6 ft 2 in (188 cm)	218 lb (99 kg)	May 31, 1980 (aged 25)	(Italy) Milano
27	F	Lucio Topatigh	6 ft 1 in (185 cm)	203 lb (92 kg)	October 19, 1965 (aged 40)	(Italy) Asiago
28	F/D	Manuel De Toni	5 ft 11 in (180 cm)	192 lb (87 kg)	January 10, 1979 (aged 27)	(Italy) Alleghe
29	G	Jason Muzzatti	6 ft 0 in (183 cm)	190 lb (86 kg)	February 3, 1970 (aged 36)	(Italy) HC Bolzano
33	F	Tony Tuzzolino	6 ft 2 in (188 cm)	201 lb (91 kg)	October 9, 1975 (aged 30)	(Sweden) MODO Hockey
34	F	Jason Cirone	5 ft 11 in (180 cm)	209 lb (95 kg)	February 21, 1971 (aged 34)	(Italy) Asiago
50	D	Christian Borgatello	5 ft 9 in (175 cm)	181 lb (82 kg)	February 10, 1982 (aged 24)	(Italy) Milano
71	F	Luca Ansoldi	6 ft 0 in (183 cm)	196 lb (89 kg)	January 5, 1982 (aged 24)	(Italy) Ritten/Renon
73	G	Günther Hell	5 ft 9 in (175 cm)	176 lb (80 kg)	August 30, 1978 (aged 27)	(Italy) HC Bolzano
85	G	René Baur	5 ft 11 in (180 cm)	176 lb (80 kg)	January 19, 1985 (aged 21)	(Italy) Pustertal/Val Pusteria
19	F	Nicola Fontanive	5 ft 6 in (168 cm)	163 lb (74 kg)	October 25, 1985 (aged 20)	(Italy) Alleghe

=== Kazakhstan ===
The following is the Kazakh roster for the men's ice hockey tournament at the 2006 Winter Olympics.

Head coach: Nikolai Myshagin

Assistant coach: (Russia) Gennadi Tsygurov

No.	Pos.	Name	Height	Weight	Birthdate	Team
1	G	Kirill Zinovyev	5 ft 11 in (180 cm)	183 lb (83 kg)	February 22, 1979 (aged 26)	(Kazakhstan) Torpedo Ust-Kamenogrosk
2	D	Alexei Vasilchenko	6 ft 1 in (185 cm)	196 lb (89 kg)	March 29, 1981 (aged 24)	(Russia) Neftekhimik Nizhnekamsk
11	D	Vladimir Antipin	6 ft 2 in (188 cm)	203 lb (92 kg)	April 18, 1970 (aged 35)	(Russia) Khimik Mytischi
12	D	Oleg Kovalenko	5 ft 10 in (178 cm)	198 lb (90 kg)	February 11, 1975 (aged 31)	(Kazakhstan) Kazzinc-Torpedo
16	D	Yevgeni Blokhin	6 ft 2 in (188 cm)	207 lb (94 kg)	May 29, 1979 (aged 26)	(Russia) HK MVD-THK Tver
17	F	Alexander Koreshkov (C)	5 ft 11 in (180 cm)	205 lb (93 kg)	October 28, 1968 (aged 37)	(Kazakhstan) Kazzinc-Torpedo
18	F	Konstantin Shafranov	6 ft 0 in (183 cm)	198 lb (90 kg)	September 11, 1968 (aged 37)	(Russia) Krylia Sovetov Moskva
19	F	Yevgeni Koreshkov (A)	5 ft 7 in (170 cm)	181 lb (82 kg)	March 11, 1970 (aged 35)	(Kazakhstan) Kazzinc-Torpedo
20	G	Vitali Kolesnik	6 ft 3 in (191 cm)	209 lb (95 kg)	August 20, 1979 (aged 26)	(United States) Lowell Lock Monsters
21	F	Dmitri Dudarev	6 ft 2 in (188 cm)	209 lb (95 kg)	February 23, 1976 (aged 29)	(Russia) Ak Bars Kazan
22	F	Andrei Ogorondnikov	5 ft 10 in (178 cm)	176 lb (80 kg)	August 29, 1982 (aged 23)	(Kazakhstan) Kazzinc-Torpedo
23	F	Andrei Pchelyakov	5 ft 10 in (178 cm)	176 lb (80 kg)	February 19, 1972 (aged 33)	(Russia) Krylia Sovetov Moskva
25	F	Andrei Samokvalov	6 ft 0 in (183 cm)	192 lb (87 kg)	May 10, 1975 (aged 30)	(Russia) Torpedo Nizhny Novgorod
26	D	Andrei Savenkov^{1}	6 ft 0 in (183 cm)	194 lb (88 kg)	March 7, 1975 (aged 30)	(Kazakhstan) Kazzinc-Torpedo
30	D	Denis Shemelin	6 ft 3 in (191 cm)	205 lb (93 kg)	June 24, 1978 (aged 27)	(Russia) Neftekhimik Nizhnekamsk
30	G	Vitali Yeremeyev	6 ft 0 in (183 cm)	203 lb (92 kg)	September 23, 1975 (aged 30)	(Russia) Dynamo Moskva
34	F	Sergei Alexandrov	5 ft 11 in (180 cm)	185 lb (84 kg)	August 29, 1978 (aged 27)	(Kazakhstan) Kazzinc-Torpedo
36	F	Dmitri Upper	6 ft 1 in (185 cm)	203 lb (92 kg)	July 27, 1978 (aged 27)	(Russia) CSKA Moskva
43	D	Yevgeni Pupkov	6 ft 0 in (183 cm)	205 lb (93 kg)	January 18, 1978 (aged 28)	(Russia) SKA St. Petersburg
52	D	Alexei Koledayev	6 ft 0 in (183 cm)	203 lb (92 kg)	March 27, 1976 (aged 29)	(Russia) Sibir Novosibirsk
55	F	Andrei Troshchinsky	6 ft 5 in (196 cm)	203 lb (92 kg)	February 14, 1978 (aged 28)	(Kazakhstan) Kazzinc-Torpedo
64	D	Artyom Argokov	6 ft 1 in (185 cm)	203 lb (92 kg)	January 16, 1976 (aged 30)	(Russia) Metallurg Novokuznetsk
79	F	Fyodor Polishchuk	5 ft 9 in (175 cm)	176 lb (80 kg)	July 4, 1979 (aged 26)	(Russia) SKA St. Petersburg
80	F	Nikolai Antropov (A)	6 ft 6 in (198 cm)	245 lb (111 kg)	February 18, 1980 (aged 25)	(Canada) Toronto Maple Leafs

- ^{1} Andrei Savenkov replaced Evgeni Blokhin on the team roster after the first two games of the tournament.

=== Latvia ===
The following is the Latvian roster for the men's ice hockey tournament at the 2006 Winter Olympics.

Head coach: Leonīds Beresņevs

Assistant coach: Harijs Vītoliņš, Oļegs Znaroks

No.	Pos.	Name	Height	Weight	Birthdate	Team
1	G	Artūrs Irbe	5 ft 9 in (175 cm)	190 lb (86 kg)	February 2, 1967 (aged 39)	(Austria) EC Salzburg
2	D	Rodrigo Laviņš	5 ft 11 in (180 cm)	185 lb (84 kg)	August 3, 1974 (aged 31)	(Sweden) Brynäs IF
3	D	Arvīds Reķis	6 ft 0 in (183 cm)	216 lb (98 kg)	January 1, 1979 (aged 27)	(Germany) Augsburger Panther
4	D	Agris Saviels	6 ft 1 in (185 cm)	203 lb (92 kg)	January 15, 1982 (aged 24)	(Russia) Torpedo Nizhny Novgorod
7	D	Kārlis Skrastiņš (C)	6 ft 2 in (188 cm)	205 lb (93 kg)	July 9, 1974 (aged 31)	(United States) Colorado Avalanche
8	D	Sandis Ozoliņš	6 ft 3 in (191 cm)	214 lb (97 kg)	August 13, 1972 (aged 33)	(United States) Mighty Ducks of Anaheim
9	F	Ģirts Ankipāns	6 ft 1 in (185 cm)	216 lb (98 kg)	November 29, 1975 (aged 30)	(Latvia) HK Riga 2000
10	F	Vladimirs Mamonovs	5 ft 10 in (178 cm)	190 lb (86 kg)	April 22, 1980 (aged 25)	(Latvia) Metalurgs Liepājas
12	F	Herberts Vasiļjevs	5 ft 11 in (180 cm)	192 lb (87 kg)	May 27, 1976 (aged 29)	(Germany) Krefeld Pinguine
13	F	Grigorijs Panteļejevs	5 ft 9 in (175 cm)	185 lb (84 kg)	November 13, 1972 (aged 33)	(Russia) HK Dmitrov
14	F	Leonids Tambijevs	5 ft 9 in (175 cm)	176 lb (80 kg)	September 26, 1970 (aged 35)	(Switzerland) EHC Basel
15	F	Māris Ziediņš	5 ft 10 in (178 cm)	174 lb (79 kg)	July 3, 1978 (aged 27)	(United States) Stockton Thunder
17	F	Aleksandrs Ņiživijs	5 ft 10 in (178 cm)	170 lb (77 kg)	September 16, 1976 (aged 29)	(Russia) Torpedo Nizhny Novgorod
18	D	Georgijs Pujacs	6 ft 1 in (185 cm)	218 lb (99 kg)	July 11, 1981 (aged 24)	(Latvia) HK Riga 2000
21	F	Armands Bērziņš	6 ft 3 in (191 cm)	212 lb (96 kg)	December 27, 1983 (aged 22)	(Latvia) HK Riga 2000
23	D	Atvars Tribuncovs	6 ft 2 in (188 cm)	220 lb (100 kg)	October 14, 1976 (aged 29)	(Sweden) Mora IK
24	F	Miķelis Rēdlihs	5 ft 11 in (180 cm)	183 lb (83 kg)	July 1, 1984 (aged 21)	(Sweden) IF Björklöven
25	D	Krišjānis Rēdlihs	6 ft 2 in (188 cm)	209 lb (95 kg)	January 15, 1981 (aged 25)	(United States) Albany River Rats
27	F	Aleksandrs Semjonovs	5 ft 11 in (180 cm)	201 lb (91 kg)	June 8, 1972 (aged 33)	(Sweden) Malmö Redhawks
29	F	Aigars Cipruss	5 ft 11 in (180 cm)	181 lb (82 kg)	January 12, 1972 (aged 34)	(Latvia) HK Riga 2000
30	G	Sergejs Naumovs	5 ft 10 in (178 cm)	181 lb (82 kg)	August 4, 1969 (aged 36)	(Russia) Khimik Voskresensk
31	G	Edgars Masaļskis	5 ft 9 in (175 cm)	181 lb (82 kg)	March 30, 1981 (aged 24)	(Russia) Neftyanik Almetievsk
47	D	Mārtiņš Cipulis	6 ft 0 in (183 cm)	183 lb (83 kg)	November 29, 1980 (aged 25)	(Latvia) HK Riga 2000

=== Russia ===
The following is the Russian roster for the men's ice hockey tournament at the 2006 Winter Olympics.

Head coach: Vladimir Krikunov

Assistant coaches: Vladimir Yurzinov, Sergei Nemchinov, Boris Mikhailov

No.	Pos.	Name	Height	Weight	Birthdate	Team
4	D	Sergei Zhukov	1.92 m (6 ft 4 in)	87 kg (192 lb)	November 23, 1975 (aged 30)	(Russia) Lokomotiv Yaroslavl
5	D	Vitaly Vishnevskiy	1.87 m (6 ft 2 in)	92 kg (203 lb)	March 18, 1980 (aged 25)	(United States) Mighty Ducks of Anaheim
6	D	Anton Volchenkov	1.85 m (6 ft 1 in)	102 kg (225 lb)	February 25, 1982 (aged 23)	(Canada) Ottawa Senators
8	F	Alexander Ovechkin	1.88 m (6 ft 2 in)	98 kg (216 lb)	October 17, 1985 (aged 20)	(United States) Washington Capitals
11	D	Darius Kasparaitis (A)	1.80 m (5 ft 11 in)	99 kg (218 lb)	October 16, 1972 (aged 33)	(United States) New York Rangers
13	F	Pavel Datsyuk	1.79 m (5 ft 10 in)	86 kg (190 lb)	July 20, 1978 (aged 27)	(United States) Detroit Red Wings
18	F	Evgeni Malkin	1.91 m (6 ft 3 in)	87 kg (192 lb)	July 31, 1986 (aged 19)	(Russia) Metallurg Magnitogorsk
20	G	Evgeni Nabokov	1.83 m (6 ft 0 in)	90 kg (198 lb)	July 25, 1975 (aged 30)	(United States) San Jose Sharks
21	F	Alexander Kharitonov	1.72 m (5 ft 8 in)	80 kg (176 lb)	March 30, 1976 (aged 29)	(Russia) Dynamo Moscow
22	F	Andrei Taratukhin	1.83 m (6 ft 0 in)	92 kg (203 lb)	February 22, 1983 (aged 22)	(Russia) Lokomotiv Yaroslavl
23	F	Ivan Nepryaev	1.88 m (6 ft 2 in)	92 kg (203 lb)	February 4, 1982 (aged 24)	(Russia) Lokomotiv Yaroslavl
24	F	Alexander Frolov	1.88 m (6 ft 2 in)	95 kg (209 lb)	June 19, 1982 (aged 23)	(United States) Los Angeles Kings
25	F	Viktor Kozlov	1.95 m (6 ft 5 in)	104 kg (229 lb)	February 14, 1975 (aged 31)	(United States) New Jersey Devils
27	F	Alexei Kovalev (C)	1.88 m (6 ft 2 in)	102 kg (225 lb)	February 24, 1973 (aged 32)	(Canada) Montreal Canadiens
29	D	Daniil Markov	1.85 m (6 ft 1 in)	86 kg (190 lb)	July 30, 1976 (aged 29)	(United States) Nashville Predators
30	G	Ilya Bryzgalov	1.88 m (6 ft 2 in)	88 kg (194 lb)	June 22, 1980 (aged 25)	(United States) Mighty Ducks of Anaheim
33	F	Maxim Sushinsky	1.72 m (5 ft 8 in)	80 kg (176 lb)	July 1, 1974 (aged 31)	(Russia) Dynamo Moscow
39	G	Maxim Sokolov	1.80 m (5 ft 11 in)	92 kg (203 lb)	May 27, 1972 (aged 33)	(Russia) SKA Saint Petersburg
51	D	Fedor Tyutin	1.88 m (6 ft 2 in)	92 kg (203 lb)	July 19, 1983 (aged 22)	(United States) New York Rangers
52	D	Andrei Markov	1.83 m (6 ft 0 in)	90 kg (198 lb)	December 20, 1978 (aged 27)	(Canada) Montreal Canadiens
55	D	Sergei Gonchar	1.85 m (6 ft 1 in)	94 kg (207 lb)	April 13, 1974 (aged 31)	(United States) Pittsburgh Penguins
61	F	Maxim Afinogenov	1.83 m (6 ft 0 in)	88 kg (194 lb)	September 4, 1979 (aged 26)	(United States) Buffalo Sabres
71	F	Ilya Kovalchuk	1.88 m (6 ft 2 in)	99 kg (218 lb)	April 15, 1983 (aged 22)	(United States) Atlanta Thrashers
79	F	Alexei Yashin (A)	1.91 m (6 ft 3 in)	100 kg (220 lb)	November 5, 1973 (aged 32)	(United States) New York Islanders
94	F	Alexander Korolyuk	1.75 m (5 ft 9 in)	80 kg (176 lb)	January 15, 1976 (aged 30)	(Russia) Vityaz Chekhov

Forwards Alexander Frolov and Alexander Korolyuk were replaced due to injuries by Andrei Taratukhin and Ivan Nepryaev, respectively.

=== Slovakia ===
The following is the Slovak roster for the men's ice hockey tournament at the 2006 Winter Olympics.

Head coach: František Hossa

Assistant coaches: Jerguš Bača, Lubomir Pokovic, Róbert Švehla

No.	Pos.	Name	Height	Weight	Birthdate	Team
3	D	Zdeno Chára	6 ft 9 in (206 cm)	249 lb (113 kg)	March 18, 1977 (aged 28)	(Canada) Ottawa Senators
6	D	Radoslav Suchý	6 ft 2 in (188 cm)	205 lb (93 kg)	April 7, 1976 (aged 29)	(United States) Columbus Blue Jackets
7	D	Martin Štrbák	6 ft 3 in (191 cm)	212 lb (96 kg)	January 15, 1975 (aged 31)	(Russia) CSKA Moskva
10	F	Marián Gáborík	6 ft 1 in (185 cm)	201 lb (91 kg)	February 14, 1982 (aged 24)	(United States) Minnesota Wild
12	F	Peter Bondra (A)	6 ft 1 in (185 cm)	201 lb (91 kg)	February 7, 1968 (aged 38)	(United States) Atlanta Thrashers
14	D	Andrej Meszároš	6 ft 2 in (188 cm)	218 lb (99 kg)	October 13, 1985 (aged 20)	(Canada) Ottawa Senators
15	F	Jozef Stümpel	6 ft 3 in (191 cm)	218 lb (99 kg)	July 20, 1972 (aged 33)	(United States) Florida Panthers
17	D	Ľubomír Višňovský	5 ft 10 in (178 cm)	192 lb (87 kg)	August 11, 1976 (aged 29)	(United States) Los Angeles Kings
18	F	Miroslav Šatan (A)	6 ft 2 in (188 cm)	194 lb (88 kg)	October 22, 1974 (aged 31)	(United States) New York Islanders
20	F	Richard Zednik	6 ft 0 in (183 cm)	192 lb (87 kg)	January 6, 1976 (aged 30)	(Canada) Montreal Canadiens
22	F	Richard Kapuš	6 ft 0 in (183 cm)	203 lb (92 kg)	February 9, 1973 (aged 33)	(Russia) Metallurg Novokuznetsk
23	F	Ľuboš Bartečko	6 ft 0 in (183 cm)	201 lb (91 kg)	July 14, 1976 (aged 29)	(Sweden) Luleå HF
25	G	Ján Lašák	6 ft 0 in (183 cm)	205 lb (93 kg)	April 10, 1979 (aged 26)	(Czech Republic) HC Pardubice
28	F	Ronald Petrovický	5 ft 10 in (178 cm)	185 lb (84 kg)	February 15, 1977 (aged 29)	(United States) Atlanta Thrashers
29	D	Ivan Majeský	6 ft 5 in (196 cm)	240 lb (110 kg)	September 2, 1976 (aged 29)	(United States) Washington Capitals
37	G	Peter Budaj	6 ft 1 in (185 cm)	196 lb (89 kg)	September 18, 1982 (aged 23)	(United States) Colorado Avalanche
38	F	Pavol Demitra (C)	6 ft 0 in (183 cm)	205 lb (93 kg)	November 29, 1974 (aged 31)	(United States) Los Angeles Kings
40	F	Marek Svatoš	5 ft 10 in (178 cm)	181 lb (82 kg)	June 17, 1982 (aged 23)	(United States) Colorado Avalanche
43	F	Tomáš Surový	6 ft 1 in (185 cm)	216 lb (98 kg)	September 24, 1981 (aged 24)	(United States) Pittsburgh Penguins
60	G	Karol Križan	5 ft 10 in (178 cm)	194 lb (88 kg)	June 5, 1980 (aged 25)	(Sweden) MODO Hockey
68	D	Milan Jurčina	6 ft 4 in (193 cm)	254 lb (115 kg)	June 7, 1983 (aged 22)	(United States) Boston Bruins
81	F	Marián Hossa	6 ft 2 in (188 cm)	207 lb (94 kg)	January 12, 1979 (aged 27)	(United States) Atlanta Thrashers
91	F	Marcel Hossa	6 ft 2 in (188 cm)	218 lb (99 kg)	October 12, 1981 (aged 24)	(United States) New York Rangers

=== Sweden ===
The following is the Swedish roster for the men's ice hockey tournament at the 2006 Winter Olympics.

Head coach: Bengt-Åke Gustafsson

Assistant coaches: Anders Eldebrink, Janne Karlsson

No.	Pos.	Name	Height	Weight	Birthdate	Birthplace	2005–06 team
1	G	Stefan Liv	184 cm (6 ft 0 in)	84 kg (185 lb)	21 December 1980	Gdynia, Poland	(Sweden) HV71
35	G	Henrik Lundqvist	185 cm (6 ft 1 in)	87 kg (192 lb)	2 March 1982	Åre	(United States) New York Rangers
32	G	Mikael Tellqvist	182 cm (6 ft 0 in)	84 kg (185 lb)	19 September 1979	Sundbyberg	(Canada) Toronto Maple Leafs
8	D	Christian Bäckman	191 cm (6 ft 3 in)	93 kg (205 lb)	28 April 1980	Alingsås	(United States) St. Louis Blues
15	D	Niclas Hävelid	182 cm (6 ft 0 in)	90 kg (200 lb)	12 April 1973	Stockholm	(United States) Atlanta Thrashers
29	D	Kenny Jönsson	191 cm (6 ft 3 in)	93 kg (205 lb)	6 October 1974	Ängelholm	(Sweden) Rögle BK
7	D	Niklas Kronwall	183 cm (6 ft 0 in)	86 kg (190 lb)	12 January 1981	Järfälla	(United States) Detroit Red Wings
5	D	Nicklas Lidström – A	188 cm (6 ft 2 in)	84 kg (185 lb)	28 April 1970	Avesta	(United States) Detroit Red Wings
2	D	Mattias Öhlund	191 cm (6 ft 3 in)	100 kg (220 lb)	9 September 1976	Piteå	(Canada) Vancouver Canucks
23	D	Ronnie Sundin	186 cm (6 ft 1 in)	98 kg (216 lb)	3 October 1970	Ludvika	(Sweden) Frölunda Indians
34	D	Daniel Tjärnqvist	188 cm (6 ft 2 in)	91 kg (201 lb)	14 October 1976	Umeå	(United States) Minnesota Wild
11	F	Daniel Alfredsson – A	182 cm (6 ft 0 in)	90 kg (200 lb)	11 December 1972	Gothenburg	(Canada) Ottawa Senators
22	F	P. J. Axelsson	185 cm (6 ft 1 in)	86 kg (190 lb)	26 February 1975	Kungälv	(United States) Boston Bruins
21	F	Peter Forsberg	183 cm (6 ft 0 in)	93 kg (205 lb)	20 July 1973	Örnsköldsvik	(United States) Philadelphia Flyers
51	F	Mika Hannula	179 cm (5 ft 10 in)	84 kg (185 lb)	2 April 1979	Huddinge	(Sweden) HV71
96	F	Tomas Holmström	183 cm (6 ft 0 in)	94 kg (207 lb)	23 January 1973	Piteå	(United States) Detroit Red Wings
72	F	Jörgen Jönsson	184 cm (6 ft 0 in)	89 kg (196 lb)	29 September 1972	Ängelholm	(Sweden) Färjestads BK
33	F	Fredrik Modin	193 cm (6 ft 4 in)	100 kg (220 lb)	8 October 1974	Sundsvall	(United States) Tampa Bay Lightning
26	F	Samuel Påhlsson	181 cm (5 ft 11 in)	94 kg (207 lb)	17 December 1977	Ånge	(United States) Mighty Ducks of Anaheim
37	F	Mikael Samuelsson	186 cm (6 ft 1 in)	94 kg (207 lb)	23 December 1976	Mariefred	(United States) Detroit Red Wings
12	F	Daniel Sedin	186 cm (6 ft 1 in)	90 kg (200 lb)	26 September 1980	Örnsköldsvik	(Canada) Vancouver Canucks
20	F	Henrik Sedin	188 cm (6 ft 2 in)	91 kg (201 lb)	26 September 1980	Örnsköldsvik	(Canada) Vancouver Canucks
13	F	Mats Sundin – C	193 cm (6 ft 4 in)	100 kg (220 lb)	13 February 1971	Bromma	(Canada) Toronto Maple Leafs
40	F	Henrik Zetterberg	180 cm (5 ft 11 in)	86 kg (190 lb)	9 October 1980	Njurunda	(United States) Detroit Red Wings

Forward Markus Näslund was initially selected, but due to a groin injury he was replaced by Tomas Holmstrom

=== Switzerland ===
The following is the Swiss roster for the men's ice hockey tournament at the 2006 Winter Olympics.

Head coach: (Canada) / (Germany) Ralph Krueger

Assistant coaches: Jakob Kölliker, (Canada) Peter John Lee

No.	Pos.	Name	Height	Weight	Birthdate	Team
3	D	Julien Vauclair	6 ft 0 in (183 cm)	203 lb (92 kg)	October 2, 1979 (aged 26)	(Switzerland) HC Lugano
4	F	Flavien Conne	5 ft 10 in (178 cm)	179 lb (81 kg)	April 10, 1980 (aged 25)	(Switzerland) HC Lugano
5	D	Severin Blindenbacher	5 ft 11 in (180 cm)	190 lb (86 kg)	March 15, 1983 (aged 22)	(Switzerland) ZSC Lions
7	D	Mark Streit (C)	5 ft 11 in (180 cm)	192 lb (87 kg)	December 11, 1977 (aged 28)	(Canada) Montreal Canadiens
10	F	Andres Ambühl^{1}	5 ft 9 in (175 cm)	190 lb (86 kg)	September 14, 1983 (aged 22)	(Switzerland) HC Davos
12	F	Patric Della Rossa	6 ft 2 in (188 cm)	203 lb (92 kg)	July 28, 1975 (aged 30)	(Switzerland) EV Zug
15	F	Paul DiPietro (A)	5 ft 9 in (175 cm)	181 lb (82 kg)	September 8, 1970 (aged 35)	(Switzerland) EV Zug
21	F	Patrick Fischer	5 ft 11 in (180 cm)	187 lb (85 kg)	October 6, 1975 (aged 30)	(Switzerland) EV Zug
22	D	Olivier Keller	6 ft 2 in (188 cm)	207 lb (94 kg)	March 20, 1971 (aged 34)	(Switzerland) EHC Basel
23	F	Thierry Paterlini	6 ft 1 in (185 cm)	205 lb (93 kg)	April 27, 1975 (aged 30)	(Switzerland) ZSC Lions
26	G	Martin Gerber	5 ft 11 in (180 cm)	207 lb (94 kg)	October 3, 1974 (aged 31)	(United States) Carolina Hurricanes
28	F	Martin Plüss	5 ft 9 in (175 cm)	170 lb (77 kg)	April 5, 1977 (aged 28)	(Sweden) Frölunda HC
29	D	Beat Forster	6 ft 1 in (185 cm)	218 lb (99 kg)	February 2, 1982 (aged 20)	(Switzerland) ZSC Lions
31	D	Mathias Seger	5 ft 11 in (180 cm)	190 lb (86 kg)	December 17, 1977 (aged 28)	(Switzerland) ZSC Lions
32	F	Ivo Rüthemann (A)	5 ft 8 in (173 cm)	174 lb (79 kg)	December 12, 1976 (aged 29)	(Switzerland) SC Bern
33	D	Steve Hirschi	5 ft 10 in (178 cm)	192 lb (87 kg)	September 18, 1981 (aged 24)	(Switzerland) HC Lugano
35	F	Sandy Jeannin	5 ft 11 in (180 cm)	183 lb (83 kg)	February 28, 1976 (aged 29)	(Switzerland) HC Lugano
38	F	Marcel Jenni	5 ft 11 in (180 cm)	194 lb (88 kg)	March 2, 1974 (aged 31)	(Switzerland) Kloten Flyers
38	F	Thomas Ziegler	5 ft 11 in (180 cm)	190 lb (86 kg)	June 9, 1978 (aged 27)	(Switzerland) SC Bern
40	G	David Aebischer	6 ft 1 in (185 cm)	187 lb (85 kg)	February 7, 1978 (aged 28)	(United States) Colorado Avalanche
44	G	Marco Bührer	5 ft 10 in (178 cm)	181 lb (82 kg)	October 9, 1979 (aged 26)	(Switzerland) SC Bern
57	D	Goran Bezina	6 ft 3 in (191 cm)	220 lb (100 kg)	March 21, 1980 (aged 25)	(Switzerland) Genève-Servette HC
67	F	Romano Lemm	6 ft 0 in (183 cm)	194 lb (88 kg)	June 25, 1984 (aged 21)	(Switzerland) Kloten Flyers
97	F	Adrian Wichser	5 ft 11 in (180 cm)	187 lb (85 kg)	March 18, 1980 (aged 25)	(Switzerland) ZSC Lions

- ^{1} Andres Ambühl replaced Thomas Ziegler on the team roster after the first five games of the tournament.

=== United States ===
The following is the American roster for the men's ice hockey tournament at the 2006 Winter Olympics.

Head coach: Peter Laviolette

Assistant Coaches: Keith Allain, Mike Sullivan

No.	Pos.	Name	Height	Weight	Birthdate	Birthplace	2005–06 team
29	G	Rick DiPietro	180 cm (5 ft 11 in)	84 kg (185 lb)	19 September 1981	Winthrop, MA	New York Islanders (NHL)
42	G	Robert Esche	185 cm (6 ft 1 in)	95 kg (209 lb)	22 January 1978	Utica, NY	Philadelphia Flyers (NHL)
47	G	John Grahame	188 cm (6 ft 2 in)	95 kg (209 lb)	31 August 1975	Denver, CO	Tampa Bay Lightning (NHL)
24	D	Chris Chelios – C	185 cm (6 ft 1 in)	86 kg (190 lb)	25 January 1962	Chicago, IL	Detroit Red Wings (NHL)
2	D	Derian Hatcher	196 cm (6 ft 5 in)	107 kg (236 lb)	4 June 1972	Sterling Heights, MI	Philadelphia Flyers (NHL)
4	D	Jordan Leopold	185 cm (6 ft 1 in)	93 kg (205 lb)	3 August 1980	Golden Valley, MN	Calgary Flames (NHL)
27	D	John-Michael Liles	178 cm (5 ft 10 in)	84 kg (185 lb)	25 November 1980	Zionsville, IN	Colorado Avalanche (NHL)
6	D	Bret Hedican	188 cm (6 ft 2 in)	93 kg (205 lb)	10 August 1970	St. Paul, MN	Carolina Hurricanes (NHL)
28	D	Brian Rafalski	175 cm (5 ft 9 in)	86 kg (190 lb)	28 September 1973	Dearborn, MI	New Jersey Devils (NHL)
23	D	Mathieu Schneider	180 cm (5 ft 11 in)	85 kg (187 lb)	12 June 1969	New York, NY	Detroit Red Wings (NHL)
55	F	Jason Blake	178 cm (5 ft 10 in)	82 kg (181 lb)	2 September 1973	Moorhead, MN	New York Islanders (NHL)
26	F	Erik Cole	188 cm (6 ft 2 in)	91 kg (201 lb)	6 November 1978	Oswego, NY	Carolina Hurricanes (NHL)
22	F	Craig Conroy	188 cm (6 ft 2 in)	91 kg (201 lb)	4 September 1971	Potsdam, NY	Los Angeles Kings (NHL)
18	F	Chris Drury	178 cm (5 ft 10 in)	82 kg (181 lb)	20 August 1976	Trumbull, CT	Buffalo Sabres (NHL)
14	F	Brian Gionta	170 cm (5 ft 7 in)	79 kg (174 lb)	18 January 1979	Rochester, NY	New Jersey Devils (NHL)
11	F	Scott Gomez	180 cm (5 ft 11 in)	91 kg (201 lb)	23 December 1979	Anchorage, AK	New Jersey Devils (NHL)
13	F	Bill Guerin	188 cm (6 ft 2 in)	95 kg (209 lb)	9 November 1970	Wilbraham, MA	Dallas Stars (NHL)
21	F	Mike Knuble	191 cm (6 ft 3 in)	103 kg (227 lb)	4 July 1972	Toronto, Ontario, Canada	Philadelphia Flyers (NHL)
9	F	Mike Modano	191 cm (6 ft 3 in)	93 kg (205 lb)	7 June 1970	Livonia, MI	Dallas Stars (NHL)
37	F	Mark Parrish	183 cm (6 ft 0 in)	91 kg (201 lb)	2 February 1977	Minneapolis, MN	New York Islanders (NHL)
12	F	Brian Rolston	188 cm (6 ft 2 in)	95 kg (209 lb)	21 February 1973	Flint, MI	Minnesota Wild (NHL)
7	F	Keith Tkachuk	188 cm (6 ft 2 in)	102 kg (225 lb)	28 March 1972	Melrose, MA	St. Louis Blues (NHL)
39	F	Doug Weight	180 cm (5 ft 11 in)	91 kg (201 lb)	21 January 1971	Warren, MI	St. Louis Blues (NHL)

== See also ==
- Ice hockey at the 2006 Winter Olympics rosters (women)
