= Frederic Cloutier =

Canadian-born Italian ice hockey player

Frédéric Cloutier
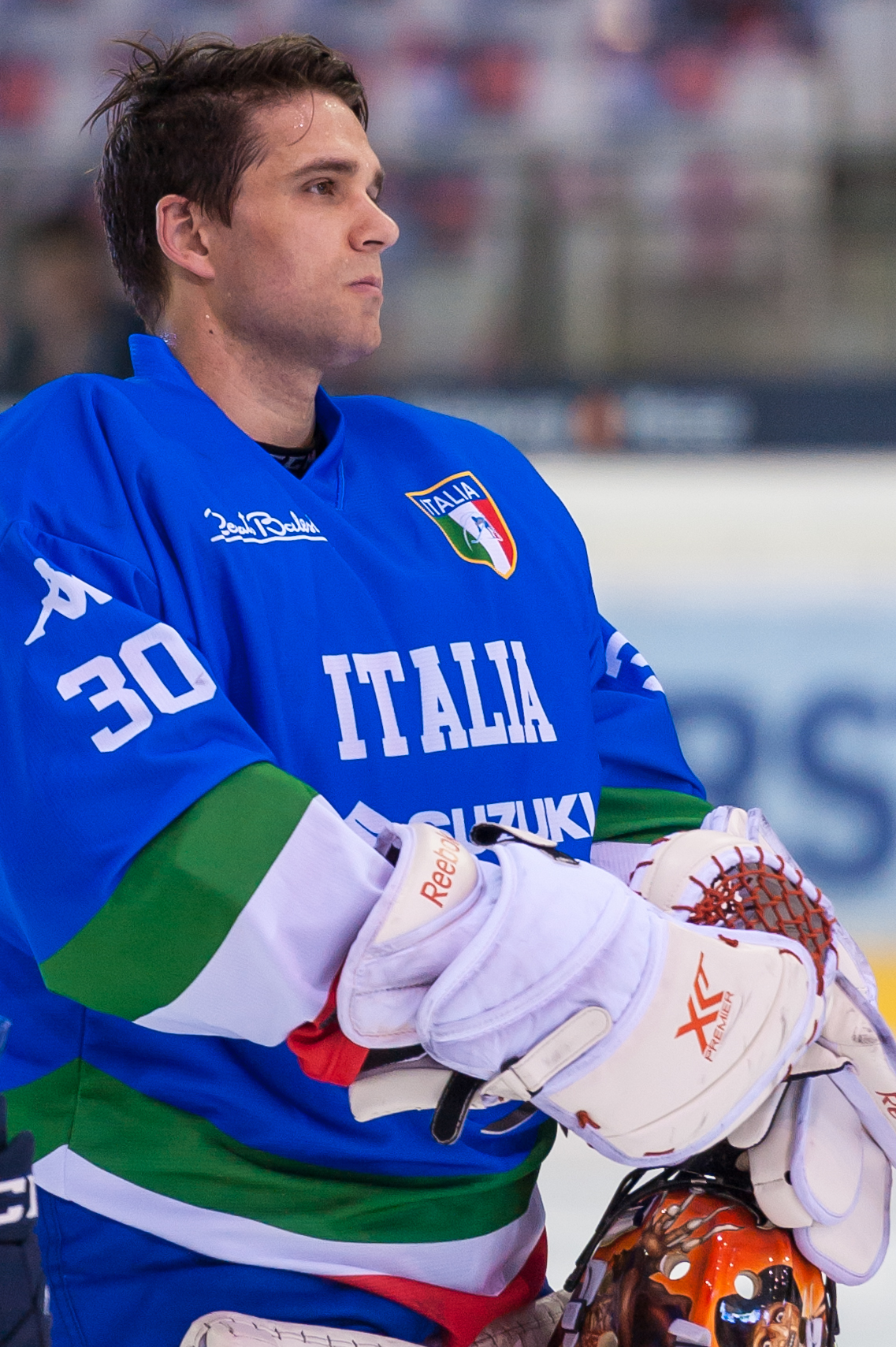
- Born: May 14, 1981 (age 45) Saint-Honoré, Quebec, Canada
- Height: 6 ft 0 in (183 cm)
- Weight: 165 lb (75 kg; 11 st 11 lb)
- Position: Goaltender
- Caught: Left
- AlpsHL team Former teams: HC Merano; Houston Aeros; Bridgeport Sound Tigers; Milwaukee Admirals; SV Ritten; Graz 99ers Starbulls Rosenheim; Bietigheim Steelers; KooKoo; Asiago Hockey; HC Bolzano; Unterland
- National team: Italy
- NHL draft: Undrafted
- Playing career: 2001–2024

Frédéric Cloutier (born May 14, 1981) is a Canadian-born Italian professional ice hockey goaltender who plays for HC Merano of the Alps Hockey League.

Undrafted by a National Hockey League (NHL) team, Cloutier played for the Bridgeport Sound Tigers. He signed with their NHL affiliate, the New York Islanders on January 5, 2006, and spent the rest of the season with them.

He played for Canada at the Spengler Cup in Switzerland.

Cloutier obtained Italian citizenship and began playing internationally for Italy in 2016.

== Awards and honours ==
- Jacques Plante Memorial Trophy - QMJHL Best GAA (2.50) (2000–01)
- QMJHL First Team All-Star (2000–01)
- ECHL Most Valuable Player (2001–02)
- ECHL Rookie of the Year (2001–02)
- Coppa Italia 2010
- Supercoppa Italiana 2009, 2010
- Alps Hockey League 2017-2018
- Mestis (silver) Runner-up (2014–15)
