= 1997–98 Serie A (ice hockey) season =

Italian ice hockey season

The 1997–98 Serie A season was the 64th season of the Serie A, the top level of ice hockey in Italy. 14 teams participated in the league, and HC Bozen won the championship by defeating WSV Sterzing in the final.

== First round ==
	Club	GP	W	T	L	GF–GA	Pts
1.	HC Bolzano	26	21	1	4	199:84	64
2.	Asiago Hockey	26	19	0	7	165:88	57
3.	EV Brunico	26	19	0	7	130:91	56
4.	SHC Fassa	26	17	1	8	144:104	52
5.	HC Meran	26	17	1	8	117:109	51
6.	HC Gherdëina	26	16	2	8	152:94	49
7.	WSV Sterzing	26	16	1	9	118:86	48
8.	SG Cortina	26	12	1	13	108:111	38
9.	HC Alleghe	26	11	2	13	124:129	35
10.	SV Ritten	26	9	1	16	109:126	28
11.	HC Courmaosta	26	8	1	17	109:152	28
12.	HC Feltre	26	6	1	19	79:156	19
13.	HC Val Venosta	26	3	0	23	74:191	9
14.	AS Varese Hockey	26	1	2	23	77:184	5

== Final round ==
	Club	GP	W	T	L	GF–GA	Pts
1.	HC Bolzano	20	15	1	4	114:63	79
2.	Asiago Hockey	20	13	0	7	84:63	68
3.	SHC Fassa	20	11	0	9	78:89	60
4.	HC Meran	20	10	1	9	97:91	54
5.	HC Gherdëina	20	8	0	12	84:93	48
6.	HC Brunico	20	2	0	18	55:113	34

== Qualification round ==
	Club	GP	W	T	L	GF–GA	Pts
7.	WSV Sterzing	14	12	0	2	80:44	59
8.	HC Alleghe	14	12	0	2	86:48	53
9.	SG Cortina	14	8	0	6	60:48	43
10.	HC Courmaosta	14	7	2	5	65:56	38
11.	SV Ritten	14	6	1	7	51:68	32
12.	HC Feltre	14	4	0	10	50:70	22
13.	AS Varese Hockey	14	4	2	8	52:70	15
14.	HC Val Venosta	14	0	1	13	45:85	6

== Playoffs ==
=== Qualification ===
- WSV Sterzing - HC Courmaosta 2:1 (5:2, 2:3, 5:4)
- HC Alleghe - SG Cortina 0:2 (4:5 n.V., 4:5 n.V.)

=== Bracket ===
Quarterfinals
1	HC Bolzano	2
8	SG Cortina	0
4	HC Meran	2
5	HC Gherdëina	0
3	SHC Fassa	2
6	EV Brunico	1
2	Asiago Hockey	1
7	WSV Sterzing	2

Semifinals
1	HC Bolzano	3
4	HC Meran	0
3	SHC Fassa	1
7	WSV Sterzing	3

Finals
1	HC Bolzano	4
7	WSV Sterzing	0

== Relegation ==
	Club	GP	W	T	L	GF–GA	Pts
1.	HC Courmaosta	10	8	0	2	60:36	24
2.	HC Alleghe	10	6	1	3	41:38	17
3.	HC Feltre	10	5	0	5	48:35	15
4.	HC Val Venosta	10	4	1	5	38:40	14
5.	AS Varese Hockey	10	3	1	6	37:52	11
6.	SV Ritten	10	2	1	7	37:60	7
