= 2001–02 Serie A (ice hockey) season =

Italian professional ice hockey season

The 2001–02 Serie A season was the 68th season of the Serie A, the top level of ice hockey in Italy. Eight teams participated in the league, and the HC Milano Vipers won the championship by defeating HC Alleghe in the final.

== Regular season ==
	Club	GP	W	OTW	OTL	L	GF–GA	Pts
1.	Asiago Hockey	42	27	1	4	10	158:93	58
2.	HC Alleghe	42	21	3	3	15	151:138	51
3.	WSV Sterzing Broncos	42	18	4	2	18	135:137	45
4.	HC Bozen	42	19	6	2	16	146:118	42
5.	HC Meran	42	14	6	6	16	133:136	41
6.	HC Milano Vipers	42	16	5	3	18	136:127	39
7.	SHC Fassa	42	15	2	3	22	113:142	30
8.	SV Ritten	42	11	1	5	25	126:202	27

== Playoffs ==
=== Quarterfinals ===
- HC Bozen - HC Meran 2:0 (2:1, 3:1)
- WSV Sterzing Broncos - HC Milano Vipers 0:2 (0:3, 2:6)

=== Semifinals ===
- HC Alleghe - HC Bozen 3:2 (3:2, 3:0, 1:4, 1:4, 3:0)
- Asiago Hockey - HC Milano Vipers 1:3 (4:3 SO, 1:2, 0:3, 2:3 SO)

=== Final ===
- HC Alleghe - HC Milano Vipers 0:4 (1:2, 1:4, 3:5, 1:6)
