= 2024–25 Alps Hockey League season =

2024–25 Alps Hockey League
- League: Alps Hockey League
- Sport: Ice hockey
- Duration: 21 September 2024 – 15 April 2025
- Games: Regular season: 234; Qualification: 44; Postseason: 41
- Teams: 13

Regular season
- Season champions: EK Zeller Eisbären
- Runners-up: Ritten Sport

Playoffs
- Finals champions: EK Zeller Eisbären
- Runners-up: HDD Jesenice

Alps Hockey League seasons
- ← 2023–24 2025–26 →

The 2024–25 Alps Hockey League season was the 9th season of play for the league. The regular season ran from 21 September 2024 to 5 February 2025 with EK Zeller Eisbären finishing atop the standings. The postseason ran from 11 February to 15 April 2025. EK Zeller Eisbären defeated HDD Jesenice 4 games to 1 for the league championship.

== Membership changes ==
- In February of 2024, EHC Lustenau revealed that they would be leaving the Alps Hockey League and be reassigned into the national Austrian ice hockey hierarchy. The club cited increasing costs and a change in mission statement as reasons for their departure.
- On April 20, the AHL announced that they would play with 14 teams for this season. At that time, they welcomed KHL Sisak as the league's first club from Croatia.
- Also in April, the HC Fassa Falcons announced that they were withdrawing from the league and would be joining the Italian Hockey League. The team cited increased cost as the sole reason for their move.
- In May, EC KAC announced that they were dissolving their Future (Junior) Team due to both economic and competitive forces.
- In July, the Steel Wings Linz announced that they would be withdrawing from the league and folding. While the AHL was surprised by the news, and were unable to secure a replacement franchise due to the impending arrival of the season, the league quickly adjusted its schedule to compensate.

== Teams ==
2024–25 Alps Hockey League teams.

Team	City	Arena	Coach
HK Celje	(Slovenia) Celje	Celje Ice Hall	(Slovenia) Gal Koren
SG Cortina	(Italy) Cortina d'Ampezzo	Stadio olimpico del ghiaccio	(Finland) Kai Suikkanen
EC Bregenzerwald	(Austria) Dornbirn	Messestadion	(Estonia) Märt Eerme
HDD Jesenice	(Slovenia) Jesenice	Podmežakla Hall	(Finland) Niko Eronen
EC Kitzbühel	(Austria) Kitzbühel	Sportpark Kapserbrucke	(Austria) Marco Pewal
HC Merano	(Italy) Merano	Meranarena	(Canada) Jarrod Skalde, (Italy) Christian Borgatello
Hockey Unterland Cavaliers	(Italy) Neumarkt	Würth Arena	(Sweden) Staffan Lund
Ritten Sport	(Italy) Ritten	Ritten Arena	(Canada) Jamie Russell
Red Bull Hockey Juniors	(Austria) Salzburg	Eisarena Salzburg	(Finland) Teemu Levijoki
HC Gherdëina	(Italy) Sëlva	Pranives Ice Stadium	(Finland) Teppo Kivelä
KHL Sisak	(Croatia) Sisak	Ledena dvorana Zibel	(Canada) Josh Siembida
Wipptal Broncos	(Italy) Sterzing	Weihenstephan Arena	(Sweden) Johan Sjöquist
EK Zeller Eisbären	(Austria) Zell am See	KE Kelit Arena	(Slovenia) Marcel Rodman

== Standings ==
=== Regular season ===
Pos	Team	Pld	W	OTW	OTL	L	GF	GA	GD	Pts	Qualification
1	EK Zeller Eisbären	36	22	4	2	8	124	86	+38	76	Advanced to Master Round
2	Ritten Sport	36	21	4	2	9	144	99	+45	73	Advanced to Master Round
3	HDD Jesenice	36	19	7	1	9	133	84	+49	72	Advanced to Master Round
4	EC Kitzbühel	36	20	4	0	12	155	98	+57	68	Advanced to Master Round
5	SG Cortina	36	16	2	8	10	108	100	+8	60	Advanced to Master Round
6	Wipptal Broncos	36	17	3	2	14	122	103	+19	59	Advanced to Group Rounds
7	KHL Sisak	36	16	1	4	15	125	114	+11	54	Advanced to Group Rounds
8	Hockey Unterland Cavaliers	36	12	4	7	13	105	123	−18	51	Advanced to Group Rounds
9	HC Merano	36	10	5	3	18	96	133	−37	43	Advanced to Group Rounds
10	Red Bull Hockey Juniors	36	10	3	3	20	86	129	−43	39	Advanced to Group Rounds
11	HK Celje	36	9	3	4	20	101	142	−41	37	Advanced to Group Rounds
12	EC Bregenzerwald	36	10	1	3	22	87	126	−39	35	Advanced to Group Rounds
13	HC Gherdëina	36	8	3	5	20	89	138	−49	35	Advanced to Group Rounds

Source: Alps Hockey League
Rules for classification: 1) Points; 2) Head-to-head points.

=== Playoff qualification ===
==== Master round ====
Home \ Away	COR	JES	KIT	RIT	ZEL	COR	JES	KIT	RIT	ZEL
SG Cortina	—	4–0	4–6	1–5	1–2	—	1–8	3–6	2–5	5–2
HDD Jesenice	0–4	—	3–2 ^{(SO)}	6–3	3–4	8–1	—	0–3	1–2	2–4
EC Kitzbühel	6–4	2–3 ^{(SO)}	—	5–6 ^{(OT)}	0–3	6–3	3–0	—	3–2 ^{(OT)}	2–3 ^{(OT)}
Ritten Sport	5–1	3–6	6–5 ^{(OT)}	—	2–3	5–2	2–1	2–3 ^{(OT)}	—	4–5
EK Zeller Eisbären	2–1	4–3	3–0	3–2	—	2–5	4–2	3–2 ^{(OT)}	5–4	—

Updated to match(es) played on Final. Source: Alps Hockey League
Legend: Blue = home team win; Yellow = draw; Red = away team win.

Pos	Team	Pld	W	OTW	OTL	L	GF	GA	GD	Pts	Qualification
1	EK Zeller Eisbären (Note: EK Zeller Eisbären gained 4 points from their regular season 1st-place finish.)	8	5	2	0	1	26	19	+7	23	Advanced to playoff quarterfinals
2	Ritten Sport (Note: Ritten Sport gained 3 points from their regular season 2nd-place finish.)	8	3	1	1	3	29	26	+3	15	Advanced to playoff quarterfinals
3	EC Kitzbühel (Note: EC Kitzbühel gained 1 points from their regular season 4th-place finish.)	8	3	1	3	1	27	24	+3	15	Advanced to playoff quarterfinals
4	HDD Jesenice (Note: HDD Jesenice gained 2 points from their regular season 3rd-place finish.)	8	2	1	1	4	23	23	0	11	Advanced to playoff quarterfinals
5	SG Cortina	8	2	0	0	6	21	34	−13	6	Advanced to playoff quarterfinals

Updated to match(es) played on unknown. Source: Alps Hockey League
Rules for classification: 1) Points; 2) Head-to-head points.

==== Group A ====
Note: Group A consists of teams that finished 6th, 9th, 10th and 13th in the standings.

Home \ Away	GHE	MER	RBH	WIP	GHE	MER	RBH	WIP
HC Gherdëina	—	4–5	6–3	0–4	—	2–4	2–3 ^{(SO)}	3–5
HC Merano	5–4	—	3–1	3–1	4–2	—	3–2 ^{(OT)}	4–3 ^{(OT)}
Red Bull Hockey Juniors	3–6	1–3	—	0–4	3–2 ^{(SO)}	2–3 ^{(OT)}	—	3–6
Wipptal Broncos	4–0	1–3	4–0	—	5–3	3–4 ^{(OT)}	6–3	—

Updated to match(es) played on Final. Source: Alps Hockey League
Legend: Blue = home team win; Yellow = draw; Red = away team win.

Pos	Team	Pld	W	OTW	OTL	L	GF	GA	GD	Pts	Qualification
1	HC Merano (Note: HC Merano gained 2 points from their regular season 9th-place finish.)	6	4	2	0	0	22	13	+9	18	Advanced to playoff eighthfinals
2	Wipptal Broncos (Note: Wipptal Broncos gained 3 points from their regular season 6th-place finish.)	6	4	0	1	1	23	13	+10	16	Advanced to playoff eighthfinals
3	HC Gherdëina	6	1	0	1	4	17	24	−7	4	Advanced to playoff eighthfinals
4	Red Bull Hockey Juniors (Note: Red Bull Hockey Juniors gained 1 points from their regular season 10th-place finish.)	6	0	1	1	4	12	24	−12	4	

Updated to match(es) played on unknown. Source: Alps Hockey League
Rules for classification: 1) Points; 2) Head-to-head points.

==== Group B ====
Note: Group B consists of teams that finished 7th, 8th, 11th and 12th in the standings.

Home \ Away	BRE	CEL	SIS	UNT	BRE	CEL	SIS	UNT
EC Bregenzerwald	—	3–2 ^{(SO)}	4–3 ^{(OT)}	5–4	—	4–1	6–4	1–4
HK Celje	2–3 ^{(SO)}	—	5–4	2–1 ^{(SO)}	1–4	—	4–3	2–6
KHL Sisak	3–4 ^{(OT)}	4–5	—	4–1	4–6	3–4	—	4–1
Hockey Unterland Cavaliers	4–5	1–2 ^{(SO)}	1–4	—	4–1	6–2	1–4	—

Updated to match(es) played on Final. Source: Alps Hockey League
Legend: Blue = home team win; Yellow = draw; Red = away team win.

Pos	Team	Pld	W	OTW	OTL	L	GF	GA	GD	Pts	Qualification
1	EC Bregenzerwald	6	3	2	0	1	23	18	+5	13	Advanced to playoff eighthfinals
2	HK Celje (Note: HK Celje gained 1 points from their regular season 11th-place finish.)	6	2	1	1	2	16	21	−5	10	Advanced to playoff eighthfinals
3	KHL Sisak (Note: KHL Sisak gained 3 points from their regular season 7th-place finish.)	6	2	0	1	3	22	21	+1	10	Advanced to playoff eighthfinals
4	Hockey Unterland Cavaliers (Note: Hockey Unterland Cavaliers gained 2 points from their regular season 8th-place finish.)	6	2	0	1	3	17	18	−1	9	

Updated to match(es) played on unknown. Source: Alps Hockey League
Rules for classification: 1) Points; 2) Head-to-head points.

=== Statistics ===
==== Scoring leaders ====
Player	Team	Pos	GP	G	A	Pts	PIM
(Canada) Ethan Szypula	Ritten Sport	C	43	21	66	87	34
(Canada) Adam Capannelli	Wipptal Broncos	C/LW	38	31	38	69	32
(Latvia) Daniels Murnieks	Hockey Unterland Cavaliers	C	35	24	36	60	24
(Czech Republic) Vlastimil Dostálek	KHL Sisak	RW	40	27	30	57	22
(Canada) Connor Sanvido	Wipptal Broncos	C/RW	40	21	32	53	25
(Finland) Niklas Ketonen	EC Kitzbühel	F	37	14	38	52	4
(Italy) Diego Cuglietta	Ritten Sport	C	31	22	28	50	12
(Sweden) Eric Hjorth	Ritten Sport	D	43	16	34	50	24
(United States) Carson Brière	KHL Sisak	C/RW	36	23	26	49	16
(Canada) Nick Huard	EK Zeller Eisbären	C	44	10	39	49	79

==== Leading goaltenders ====
The following goaltenders led the league in goals against average, provided that they have played at least 1/3 of their team's minutes.

Player	Team	GP	TOI	W	L	GA	SO	SV%	GAA
(Austria) Max Zimmermann	EK Zeller Eisbären	30	1812	22	8	58	5	.935	1.92
(United States) Hayden Hawkey	SG Cortina	30	1777	15	14	66	3	.912	2.23
(Slovenia) Žan Us	HDD Jesenice	33	1983	19	14	75	2	.926	2.27
(Czech Republic) Dominik Groh	Wipptal Broncos	41	2453	24	17	98	3	.922	2.40
(Austria) Alexander Schmidt	EC Kitzbühel	36	2125	22	13	86	3	.901	2.43

== Playoffs ==
=== Bracket ===
Note: After the Eighthfinals, the teams from the group rounds were reseeded according to their regular season records.

Eighthfinals (best-of-3)
A1	HC Merano	4*	2	-
B3	KHL Sisak	3	0	-
A2	Wipptal Broncos	2	1	4
B2	HK Celje	4	0	1
A3	HC Gherdëina	1	4	3
B1	EC Bregenzerwald	3	1	4

Quarterfinals (best-of-7)
M1	EK Zeller Eisbären	3	3	3	7	-	-	-
8	EC Bregenzerwald	1	2	1	3	-	-	-
M2	Ritten Sport	3	4	3	5	1	0	7
7	HC Merano	0	3	4	2	2**	2	2
M3	EC Kitzbühel	4	1	3	1	-	-	-
6	Wipptal Broncos	5	2	5	2	-	-	-
M4	HDD Jesenice	2*	4	7	1	7	-	-
M5	SG Cortina	1	1	2	6	4	-	-

Semifinals (best-of-7)
M1	EK Zeller Eisbären	3	4	4	3	-	-	-
6	Wipptal Broncos	1	2	1	0	-	-	-
(Pairings are re-seeded after the first and second round)
M2	Ritten Sport	1	2	3	3	-	-	-
M4	HDD Jesenice	2**	3	4*	4**	-	-	-

Championship (best-of-7)
M1	EK Zeller Eisbären	1	4	4	4*	5	-	-
M4	HDD Jesenice	3	0	3	3	1	-	-

Note: * denotes overtime period(s)
