= 2024–25 Italian Hockey League - Serie A season =

- League: Italian Hockey League - Serie A
- Sport: Ice hockey
- Duration: 21 January 2025 – 28 January 2025
- Games: 6
- Teams: 4

Playoffs
- Finals champions: SG Cortina
- Runners-up: Ritten Sport

Italian Hockey League - Serie A seasons
- ← 2023–24 2025–26 →

The 2024–25 Italian Hockey League - Serie A season was the 91st season of professional ice hockey in Italy. SG Cortina defeated Ritten Sport 2 games to 0 for the championship.

== Teams ==
2024–25 Serie A teams.

Team	City	Arena	Coach
SG Cortina	Cortina d'Ampezzo	Stadio olimpico del ghiaccio	(Finland) Kai Suikkanen
HC Merano	Merano	Meranarena	(Canada) Jarrod Skalde, (Italy) Christian Borgatello
Ritten Sport	Ritten	Ritten Arena	(Canada) Jamie Russell
HC Gherdëina	Sëlva	Pranives Ice Stadium	(Finland) Teppo Kivelä

== Playoffs ==
=== Bracket ===
Note: Four Italian-based teams from the Alps Hockey League qualified for the championship series.

Semifinals (best-of-3)
SG Cortina	5	4	-
HC Gherdëina	0	0	-
Ritten Sport	6*	5	-
HC Merano	5	3	-

Championship (best-of-3)
SG Cortina	5	3	-
Ritten Sport	4	0	-

Note: * denotes overtime period(s)
