= Brian Loney =

Canadian ice hockey player

- Born: August 9, 1972 (age 54) Winnipeg, Manitoba, Canada
- Height: 6 ft 2 in (188 cm)
- Weight: 196 lb (89 kg; 14 st 0 lb)
- Position: Right wing
- Shot: Right
- Played for: Vancouver Canucks
- National team: Canada
- NHL draft: 110th overall, 1992; Vancouver Canucks
- Playing career: 1990–2004

Brian D. Loney (born August 9, 1972) is a Canadian former professional ice hockey player.

== Biography ==
Loney was born in Winnipeg, Manitoba. As a youth, he played in the 1985 Quebec International Pee-Wee Hockey Tournament with the Winnipeg South Monarchs minor ice hockey team.

Loney was named to the All-CCHA Rookie Team in the 1991-92 season. He later played twelve games in the National Hockey League with the Vancouver Canucks.

== Career statistics ==
			Regular season					Playoffs
Season	Team	League	GP	G	A	Pts	PIM	GP	G	A	Pts	PIM
1990–91	Notre Dame Hounds	SJHL	43	33	45	78	98	—	—	—	—	—
1991–92	Ohio State University	NCAA	37	21	34	55	109	—	—	—	—	—
1992–93	Red Deer Rebels	WHL	66	39	36	75	147	4	1	1	2	19
1992–93	Hamilton Canucks	AHL	3	0	2	2	0	—	—	—	—	—
1993–94	Hamilton Canucks	AHL	67	18	16	34	76	4	0	0	0	8
1994–95	Syracuse Crunch	AHL	67	23	17	40	98	—	—	—	—	—
1995–96	Syracuse Crunch	AHL	48	34	17	51	157	14	3	8	11	20
1995–96	Vancouver Canucks	NHL	12	2	3	5	6	—	—	—	—	—
1996–97	Syracuse Crunch	AHL	76	19	39	58	123	3	0	0	0	0
1997–98	Kassel Huskies	DEL	15	6	6	12	22	4	0	1	1	2
1997–98	Lukko	Liiga	12	5	2	7	45	—	—	—	—	—
1998–99	Central Texas Stampede	WPHL	25	18	33	51	43	—	—	—	—	—
1998–99	HC Bolzano	Italy	19	12	12	24	46	—	—	—	—	—
1999–00	Augsburger Panther	DEL	33	5	9	14	44	—	—	—	—	—
1999–00	HC Bolzano	Italy	15	15	21	36	45	12	11	7	18	44
2000–01	HC Fassa	Italy	24	18	14	32	118	—	—	—	—	—
2001–02	Greensboro Generals	ECHL	29	7	15	22	74	—	—	—	—	—
2001–02	HC Bolzano	Italy	10	3	9	12	6	—	—	—	—	—
2002–03	EC Bad Nauheim	Germany2	47	17	28	45	212	4	0	3	3	34
2003–04	EC Bad Nauheim	Germany2	22	8	13	21	116	10	1	3	4	26
NHL totals			12	2	3	5	6	—	—	—	—	—
AHL totals			261	94	91	185	454	21	3	8	11	28

Awards and achievements
Preceded by Brian Wiseman	CCHA Rookie of the Year; 1991–92	Succeeded by Chris Brooks
