= 2021–22 Italian Hockey League - Serie A season =

- League: Italian Hockey League - Serie A
- Sport: Ice hockey
- Duration: 11 September 2021 – 12 February 2022
- Number of teams: 7

Regular season
- Best record: Asiago Hockey

Playoffs

Finals
- Champions: Asiago Hockey
- Runners-up: Ritten Sport

Italian Hockey League - Serie A seasons
- ← 2020–21 2022–23 →

The 2021–22 Italian Hockey League - Serie A was the 88th season of the Serie A, the top level of ice hockey in Italy. 7 teams participated in the league, and Asiago Hockey won the championship.

== Teams ==
The teams licensed to play in the Italian Hockey League - Serie A 2021–22 are the seven Italian teams playing the 2021-22 Alps Hockey League.

Team	Arena	Capacity
SG Cortina	Stadio Olimpico del Ghiaccio	2,700
HC Merano	Meranarena	3,000
Wipptal Broncos	Weihenstephan Arena	1,700
Asiago Hockey	Pala Hodegart	3,000
HC Fassa	Stadio del Ghiaccio Gianmario Scola	3,500
Ritten Sport	Ritten Arena	2,000
HC Gherdëina	Pranives Ice Stadium	2,000

== Regular season ==
Pos	Team	Pld	W	OTW	OTL	L	GF	GA	GD	Pts	Qualification
1	Asiago Hockey	12	9	0	0	3	48	22	+26	27	Qualification to Final round
2	Ritten Sport	12	8	1	0	3	45	29	+16	26	Qualification to Final round
3	HC Gherdëina	12	6	0	1	5	35	40	−5	19	Qualification to Final round
4	SG Cortina	12	4	2	0	6	38	34	+4	16	Qualification to Final round
5	HC Merano	12	5	0	1	6	28	43	−15	16	
6	HC Fassa	12	4	0	1	7	40	44	−4	13	
7	Wipptal Broncos	12	3	0	0	9	24	46	−22	9	

Source: Italian Hockey League

=== Results ===
Home	Away						
Home	Asiago	Cortina	Gherdëina	Fassa	Merano	Ritten	Wipptal
Asiago Hockey	–	3–2	4–1	5–2	7–0	8–1	5–2
SG Cortina	1–4	–	3–6	5–4 OT	1–3	4–1	2–3
HC Gherdëina	0–5	2–3 OT	–	7–5	3–4	1–5	4–1
HC Fassa	4–0	2–4	4–0	–	2–3	2–4	4–5
HC Merano	3–2	0–5	1–3	4–5	–	3–4 GWS	3–2
Ritten Sport	5–1	4–1	3–4	5–2	5–3	–	4–0
Wipptal Broncos	1–4	2–7	2–4	2–4	4–1	0–4	–
OT - Overtime. GWS - Shootout.

Source:Italian Hockey League

== Final round ==
Pos	Team	Pld	W	OTW	OTL	L	GF	GA	GD	Pts	Qualification
1	Asiago Hockey	3	2	0	1	0	8	5	+3	7	Champions
2	Ritten Sport	3	2	0	0	1	8	3	+5	6	
3	HC Gherdëina	3	0	1	1	1	7	9	−2	3	
4	SG Cortina	3	0	1	0	2	5	11	−6	2	

Source: Italian Hockey League

=== Results ===
Fixtures
Date	Time	Home	Score	Away	Location	Recap
8 February	20:30	Asiago Hockey	4–1	SG Cortina	Hodegart	
8 February	20:00	Ritten Sport	3–1	HC Gherdëina	Arena Ritten	
10 February	20:30	HC Gherdëina	3–2 OT	Asiago Hockey	Pranives	
10 February	20:00	Ritten Sport	4–0	SG Cortina	Arena Ritten	
12 February	20:30	Asiago Hockey	2–1	Ritten Sport	Hodegart	
12 February	18:00	SG Cortina	4–3 OT	HC Gherdëina	Stadio olimpico del ghiaccio	

== Final rankings ==
Gold medal	Asiago Hockey
Silver medal	Ritten Sport
Bronze medal	HC Gherdëina
4	SG Cortina
5	HC Merano
6	HC Fassa
7	Wipptal Broncos
