= 2000–01 Serie A (ice hockey) season =

Italian professional ice hockey season

The 2000–01 Serie A season was the 67th season of the Serie A, the top level of ice hockey in Italy. Nine teams participated in the league, and Asiago Hockey won the championship by defeating HC Milan in the final.

== First round ==
	Club	GP	W	OTW	OTL	L	GF–GA	Pts
1.	Asiago Hockey	32	21	3	2	6	139:90	71
2.	HC Bozen	32	18	4	1	9	142:99	63
3.	HC Milan	32	18	1	3	10	133:92	59
4.	WSV Sterzing Broncos	32	14	4	3	11	123:127	53
5.	HC Meran	32	12	4	2	14	112:115	46
6.	HC Alleghe	32	12	1	4	15	112:116	42
7.	SHC Fassa	32	10	1	3	18	106:142	35
8.	SV Ritten	32	10	2	1	19	123:139	35
9.	HC Brunico	32	7	2	3	20	95:165	28

== Second round ==
=== Final round ===
	Club	GP	W	OTW	OTL	L	GF–GA	Pts (Bonus)
1.	Asiago Hockey	6	4	0	1	1	20:9	36(23)
2.	HC Bozen	6	3	0	2	1	17:17	32(21)
3.	HC Milan	6	0	3	1	2	12:12	26(19)
4.	WSV Sterzing Broncos	6	1	1	0	4	7:18	22(17)

=== Qualification round ===
	Club	GP	W	OTW	OTL	L	GF–GA	Pts (Bonus)
5.	HC Meran	8	4	1	0	3	15:37	29(15)
6.	HC Alleghe	8	4	0	1	3	54:21	27(14)
7.	HC Brunico	8	5	0	0	3	28:29	24(9)
8.	SV Ritten	8	3	1	0	4	44:29	22(11)
9.	SHC Fassa	8	2	0	1	5	36:37	18(11)

== Playoffs ==
Quarter-finals
Asiago Hockey	3
SV Ritten	0
WSV Sterzing Broncos	3
HC Meran	2
HC Bozen	3
HC Brunico	1
HC Milan	3
HC Alleghe	1

Semi-finals
Asiago Hockey	2
WSV Sterzing Broncos	1
HC Bozen	1
HC Milan	3

Final
Asiago Hockey	3
HC Milan	1
