= Dylan Di Perna =

Canadian-Italian ice hockey player (born 1996)

- Born: 26 April 1996 (age 30) Mississauga, Ontario, Canada
- Height: 6 ft 2 in (188 cm)
- Weight: 203 lb (92 kg; 14 st 7 lb)
- Position: Defence
- Shoots: Right
- ICEHL team Former teams: HC Bolzano; Ritten
- National team: Italy
- NHL draft: Undrafted
- Playing career: 2020–present

Dylan Damian Di Perna (born 26 April 1996) is a Canadian-Italian professional ice hockey player who is a defenceman for HC Bozen–Bolzano in the ICE Hockey League (ICEHL).

== Playing career ==
He was selected by the Kingston Frontenacs in the 2012 OHL Priority Selection.

On 20 November 2013, Di Perna was traded to the Kitchener Rangers in exchange for Evan McEneny.

Di Perna competed in U Sports for the Saint Mary's Huskies from 2017 to 2020.

== International play ==
Di Perna represented the Italy national team at the 2026 Winter Olympics.

== Personal life ==
Di Perna is of Italian descent.

== Career statistics ==
=== Regular season and playoffs ===
			Regular season					Playoffs
Season	Team	League	GP	G	A	Pts	PIM	GP	G	A	Pts	PIM
2011–12	Mississauga Rebels U16 AAA	GTHL U16	60	9	22	31	37	—	—	—	—	—
2012–13	Kingston Frontenacs	OHL	46	2	5	7	17	4	0	0	0	4
2013–14	Kingston Frontenacs	OHL	20	1	2	3	14	—	—	—	—	—
2013–14	Kitchener Rangers	OHL	37	0	1	1	33	—	—	—	—	—
2014–15	Kitchener Rangers	OHL	53	3	4	7	14	6	0	0	0	0
2015–16	Kitchener Rangers	OHL	68	6	20	26	26	9	0	4	4	6
2016–17	Kitchener Rangers	OHL	65	9	29	38	56	5	0	0	0	2
2017–18	Saint Mary's University	U Sports	30	5	16	21	22	9	1	3	4	4
2018–19	Saint Mary's University	U Sports	29	8	5	13	52	5	0	0	0	14
2019–20	Saint Mary's University	U Sports	29	2	12	14	60	7	1	2	3	6
2020–21	HC Bolzano	ICEHL	47	1	7	8	41	11	0	1	1	2
2021–22	HC Bolzano	ICEHL	22	1	3	4	10	0	0	0	0	0
2021–22	Ritten Sport	AlpsHL	11	1	6	7	10	9	0	0	0	6
2021–22	Ritten Sport	Italy	3	1	0	1	0	—	—	—	—	—
2022–23	HC Bolzano	ICEHL	39	0	5	5	20	19	0	2	2	4
2023–24	HC Bolzano	ICEHL	48	1	9	10	21	12	1	1	2	10
2024–25	HC Bolzano	ICEHL	48	1	9	10	22	11	0	2	2	2
2025–26	HC Bolzano	ICEHL	31	1	5	6	12	3	0	0	0	0
ICEHL totals			235	5	38	43	126	56	1	6	7	18

=== International ===
Year	Team	Event	GP	G	A	Pts	PIM
2013	Canada Ontario U17	WHC-17	5	0	0	0	12
2022	Italy	WC	7	0	1	1	27
2025	Italy	WC (D1A)	4	0	0	0	0
2026	Italy	OG	4	0	0	0	2
2026	Italy	WC	7	0	0	0	4
Junior totals			5	0	0	0	12
Senior totals			22	0	1	1	33
