= 1998–99 Serie A (ice hockey) season =

Italian professional ice hockey season

The 1998–99 Serie A season was the 65th season of the Serie A, the top level of ice hockey in Italy. Nine teams participated in the league, and HC Meran won the championship by defeating HC Bozen in the final.

== Regular season ==
	Club	GP	W	L(OT+SO)	GF–GA	Pts (Bonus)
1.	HC Bozen	16	12	4(0)	94:58	37(13)
2.	HC Meran	16	12	4(1)	95:58	36(11)
3.	SG Cortina	16	11	5(1)	65:47	33(10)
4.	Asiago Hockey	16	9	7(3)	92:66	32(11)
5.	WSV Sterzing Broncos	16	9	7(1)	79:65	30(12)*
6.	SHC Fassa	16	9	7(1)	69:59	25(6)
7.	HC Alleghe	16	5	11(1)	58:90	17(6)
8.	HC Brunico	16	3	13(2)	55:101	13(5)
9.	HC Courmaosta	16	2	14(1)	45:108	8(3)

== Playoffs ==
Quarterfinals
1	HC Bozen	3
8	HC Brunico	0
4	Asiago Hockey	0
5	WSV Sterzing Broncos	3
2	HC Meran	3
7	HC Alleghe	0
3	SG Cortina	3
6	SHC Fassa	1

Semifinals
1	HC Bozen	3
5	WSV Sterzing Broncos	0
2	HC Meran	3
3	SG Cortina	1

Finals
1	HC Bozen	0
2	HC Meran	3
