= Tom Barrasso =

American ice hockey player (born 1965)

- Hockey Hall of Fame, 2023
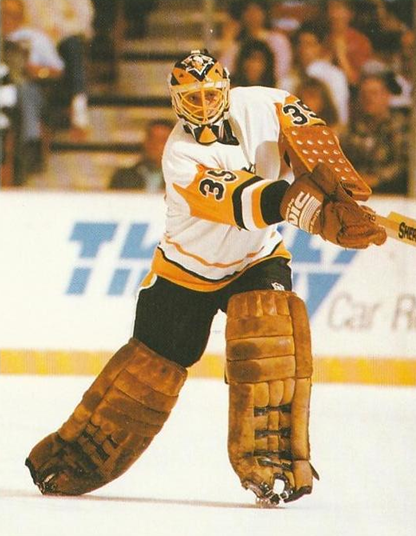
- Barrasso with the Pittsburgh Penguins in 1989
- Born: March 31, 1965 (age 61) Boston, Massachusetts, U.S.
- Height: 6 ft 3 in (191 cm)
- Weight: 210 lb (95 kg; 15 st 0 lb)
- Position: Goaltender
- Caught: Right
- Played for: Buffalo Sabres; Pittsburgh Penguins; Ottawa Senators; Carolina Hurricanes; Toronto Maple Leafs; St. Louis Blues
- National team: United States
- NHL draft: 5th overall, 1983; Buffalo Sabres
- Playing career: 1983–2002

Thomas Patrick Barrasso (born March 31, 1965) is an American professional ice hockey coach and former professional ice hockey goaltender. He played in the National Hockey League (NHL) for 18 seasons. Barrasso began his time in the NHL with the Buffalo Sabres, who selected him fifth overall in the 1983 NHL entry draft out of high school. He was traded to the Pittsburgh Penguins in 1988, where he would best be remembered and spend the majority of his career. Barrasso spent parts of 12 seasons with the Penguins, and was a Stanley Cup champion in 1991 and 1992. After being traded to the Ottawa Senators in March 2000 and sitting out the 2000–01 season, his final two seasons were split playing for the Carolina Hurricanes, Toronto Maple Leafs, and St. Louis Blues. Barrasso was inducted into the United States Hockey Hall of Fame in 2009 and was inducted into the Hockey Hall of Fame in 2023.

After retiring as a player, Barrasso served on the coaching staff of the NHL's Carolina Hurricanes. In 2012, Barrasso was hired by Metallurg Magnitogorsk of the Kontinental Hockey League (KHL) as a member of its coaching staff. In 2016, he joined Asiago Hockey of the Alps Hockey League as their head coach, winning the 2017–18 league championship. In October 2018, Barrasso was hired as head coach of the EIHL's Sheffield Steelers, where he coached for a year.

== Early life ==
Barrasso grew up in the town of Stow, Massachusetts, playing ice hockey on an outdoor rink. He started playing goaltender at the age of five years and by the time he was a teenager, he was playing in net for Acton-Boxborough with fellow NHL players Bob Sweeney and Jeff Norton, as well as fellow goalie Kelly Dyer. Barrasso was considered one of the most promising American goaltending prospects of all time.

== Playing career ==
=== Buffalo Sabres ===
He was drafted by the Buffalo Sabres with the fifth overall pick in 1983. Skipping a college career, he went straight from high school to the NHL. At the time of his debut with the Sabres on October 5, 1983, less than six months after graduating from high school, Barrasso, who saved all but three shots in a 5–3 victory over the Hartford Whalers was the youngest goaltender to play and win a game in the NHL since Harry Lumley nearly forty years prior. In October, he posted a 4–1–1 record with a 2.63 goals-against average in October as he won the inaugural NHL Rookie of the Month award. In 42 games, he went 26–12–3 with a goals against average (GAA) of 2.85 with two shutouts. He won the Calder Memorial Trophy and Vezina Trophy in his first season, becoming the third player to win both awards in the same year. In the playoffs that year, Barrasso started two games but allowed eight goals as the Sabres were swept by the Quebec Nordiques in the first round. He was named to the NHL All-Star team, becoming only the sixth player in history to be named to the First Team and win the Calder Trophy.

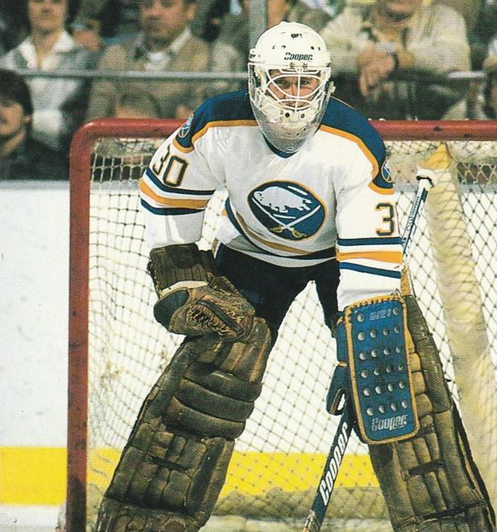
Barrasso with the Buffalo Sabres in 1985

The following season saw the team struggle early to where head coach Scotty Bowman tried to shake up the team by sending Barrasso down to the American Hockey League team in Rochester. He played five games with the team (the only games he played in the AHL) before returning to the Sabres. He was named to the All-Star Game for the first time that year and ultimately finished with a record of 25–18–10 with a GAA of 2.66 with five shutouts for the Sabres. He won the William M. Jennings Trophy in a tandem with Bob Sauve for allowing the fewest number of goals that year and Barrasso led the league in ties and GAA while finishing 2nd in the Vezina voting. In the playoffs, he went 2–3 while allowing 22 goals. He played 60 games (while leading the league in saves with 1,564) in his third season as a Sabre, going 29–24–5 but the Sabres missed the playoffs. The 1986–87 season saw him struggle on his way to a record of 17–23–2 to where he received boos from the Buffalo crowd for select games of the year. He rebounded with a 25–18–8 record the following year as the Sabres lost in four games in the playoffs where he allowed 16 goals. The 1988–89 season saw him appear in ten games for the Sabres and go 2–7 with a GAA of 4.95 prior to being traded.

=== Pittsburgh Penguins ===
On November 12, 1988, the month before he was fired as general manager of the Pittsburgh Penguins, Tony Esposito traded for Barrasso (alongside a third-round draft pick), with the Sabres receiving Doug Bodger and Darrin Shannon. Barrasso played in 44 games of the latter end of the 1988–89 season and went 18–15–7 as the Penguins made the Stanley Cup playoffs. He was the primary starter for the playoff run, going 7–4 as the Penguins lost in the Division Finals.

Barrasso was the starter for the 1989–90 season until he had injuries that saw him miss all of November and later February and most of March 1990. He appeared in 24 total games, going 7–12–3 as the Penguins missed the playoffs. Barrasso had his first shutout as a Penguin on December 28, 1990 against the Detroit Red Wings, recording 27 saves. He appeared in 20 of the 24 playoff games that year, going 12–7 while recording a shutout in the pivotal Game 6 of the Stanley Cup Final. Minnesota North Stars that saw him record a shutout of 39 saves at Pittsburgh won their first ever Stanley Cup. He went 25–22–9 in the 1991–92 season with a 3.53 GAA and a shutout. He started in all 21 playoff games, going 16–5 with a shutout that saw him set a league record with eleven straight playoff wins. In the Stanley Cup Final against the Chicago Blackhawks, he faced Ed Belfour, who had won eleven straight games to set a new record before the Penguins swept the Blackhawks that saw Barrasso share the record with Belfour. In Game 1, Barrasso was tagged for three goals in the first period and were leading 4–1 midway through the second period before a litany of Penguin goals, including one with 13 seconds remaining, led to Pittsburgh pulling away with a 5–4 victory. In Game 2, Barrasso had 18 saves on 19 shots in a 3–1 victory while Game 3 saw Barrasso stop all 27 shots in a 1–0 victory for Pittsburgh. In Game 4, he had 24 saves on 29 shots in Game 4 as the Penguins prevailed 6–5 to complete the sweep and win the Cup. It was his play in these Cup runs that established him as a "money goalie".

The 1992–93 season saw him lead the league in wins, doing so with 43–14–5 record in 63 games played with a 3.01 GAA and four shutouts. He was the runner-up to the Vezina that year as he tied Tiny Thompson's NHL record with fourteen straight wins, doing so from March 9, 1993, to April 9, 1993. The Penguins aimed for a third straight Cup, but they were upset in the second round by the New York Islanders in Game 7 on David Volek's goal in overtime that went past Barrasso. The 1993–94 season saw him play in 44 games and go 22–15–5 with a 3.36 GAA; in the playoffs, the Penguins lost in the first round in six games, with Barrasso giving up 17 goals in six games as his wrist started to have problems during the series. To add insult to injury, he was charged with making terrorist threats against a man that had gotten injured in an altercation with Penguin defenseman Peter Taglianetti and strength coach John Welday at a party in the aftermath of the playoff elimination (reportedly, the man had complained about being bumped repeatedly before being hit by Taglianetti and then head-butted by Welday). Apparently, Barrasso was so offended that Pittsburgh media chose to write about the incident that he rarely spoke with the media from that point on.

He missed most of the 1994–95 season due to requiring wrist surgery after the pain did not go away in the summer. The 1995–96 season saw him go 29–16–2 with a 3.43 GAA before the Penguins lost in the Eastern Conference Finals to the Florida Panthers; Barrasso allowed 26 goals on 337 shots. He missed all but five games of the 1996–97 due to a shoulder injury. In 1997, he became the first American goaltender to record 300 NHL wins, doing so on October 19, 1997, against the Florida Panthers on 23 shots. Barrasso played in just 25 games in the 1999–2000 season, which saw him miss games due to a knee injury and also drew a four-game suspension when he slashed Yanic Perreault (which resulted in a broken left forearm) of the Toronto Maple Leafs on December 4.

During his final seasons with the Pittsburgh Penguins, the goaltender maintained a strained relationship with local media due to perceived disrespect toward himself and his family, which included an entire season where he declined speaking with reporters. Following Tom Barrasso's departure in 2000, the #35 jersey went unworn by any Penguins player for eight years until Ty Conklin wore it in 2008 and goaltender Tristan Jarry wore it from 2017 until his trade to the Edmonton Oilers in December 2025.

=== Last years ===
In March 2000, Barrasso was traded to the Ottawa Senators for Ron Tugnutt and Janne Laukkanen in a deal that was seen as a risk for both teams. He was uneven in Ottawa, going 3–4 in seven starts and losing the first two games of Ottawa's first round series with rivals Toronto before bouncing back and winning the next two games to even the series. After evening the series, Barrasso caused a furor during the CBC's broadcast when he said during an on-air interview on April 20 that he "really couldn't give a shit what you people have to say". Barrasso would apologize the next day for using vulgar language, although he stood by his sentiments in the interview, stating the year had been very stressful for him. The Senators would go on to lose the next two games and the series to the Maple Leafs in six games.

After his playoff run with Ottawa, Barrasso's contract expired and he did not re-sign with the Senators. He then spent the entire 2000–01 season out of hockey to be with his family, following the cancer diagnosis of his daughter and death of his father from cancer. Following a favourable prognosis of his daughter's condition and regaining mental clarity following what Barasso described as a difficult year in his personal life, Barasso returned to hockey signing a one-year contract with the Carolina Hurricanes on July 17, 2001, for the 2001–02 season. Barasso also enjoyed some international success this season, winning a silver medal at the 2002 Winter Olympics playing for Team USA. Barasso expressed interest in playing with the Hurricanes following a June 2001 dinner with former Pittsburgh teammate Ron Francis, who had since joined Carolina.

Although Barasso had strong play in Carolina splitting the net with Artūrs Irbe, on March 14, 2002, he was traded to the Toronto Maple Leafs in exchange for Toronto's fourth-round pick in the 2003 NHL draft. He made his Toronto debut on March 21, in a 4–3 loss to the Washington Capitals. Ultimately, Barrasso would only appear in four games with Toronto as the back-up to Curtis Joseph; in the playoffs, Barasso was on the bench as the Maple Leafs lost in the Eastern Conference Finals to the Hurricanes. Barrasso was not signed to a new contract in the offseason, becoming an unrestricted free agent.

Unsigned to a new deal in the NHL offseason, Barrasso began the season as a free agent before later signing a contract with the St. Louis Blues on November 4, 2002. Barrasso would only appear in 6 contests with the Blues between November 12 and 29, recording one win, before mutually agreeing with the team to release him from his contract on December 28. Unsigned for the rest of the season, Barrasso announced his retirement on June 19, 2003. He signed a pro forma contract with Pittsburgh on the day he declared retirement so he could leave hockey as a Penguin.

== Hockey Hall of Fame ==
In 2023, Barrasso was named as an inductee to that year's Hockey Hall of Fame class, to be formally inducted in November, after first being eligible for inclusion to the Hall in 2006. In the years following Barrasso's retirement, he had frequently been cited as a worthy candidate, given his play and statistical accomplishments; however, Barrasso's confrontational and rude personality (particularity with members of the media) had been noted as explanations for why Barrasso was not named to the Hall of Fame for 17 years. Barrasso's public perception of having a difficult personality had existed since his playing days. When traded from Pittsburgh to Ottawa, Senators management received backlash from fans for acquiring Barrasso, with criticism directed to his personality and conflicts with teammates prior to the trade.

Penguins teammate Bob Errey stated the following about Barrasso in an article reflecting on Barrasso's induction into the Hall of Fame:

I don’t want to say he was taken for granted. Nobody who played with him did. But is he appreciated enough, especially back in Pittsburgh? Probably not. But he’s going into the Hall of Fame. I’ll tell you this, too: Everything that’s happened since our teams in the early 1990s, all the success — none of it happens in the first place without Tom Barrasso. You need to have the goalie. We did.

== International play ==
Medal record

Representing United States

Men's ice hockey

Olympic Games
| Silver medal – second place | 2002 Salt Lake City | |

Barrasso won an Olympic silver medal as part of the U.S. national men's ice hockey team at the 2002 Winter Games in Salt Lake City. He played in one game, an 8–1 victory over Belarus on February 18.

Barrasso had originally intended to play for the 1984 U.S. Olympic team in Sarajevo, but chose to begin his professional career instead and left the team in September 1983 to sign with the Sabres. He made his debut for Team USA at the 1984 Canada Cup, at the age of 19; Sweden tagged him for four quick goals due to a habit of his to leave his feet that could not match up with the Swedish post-to-post patterns. He also played in the 1983 World Junior Championships, the 1986 World Ice Hockey Championships and the 1987 Canada Cup.

== Coaching career ==
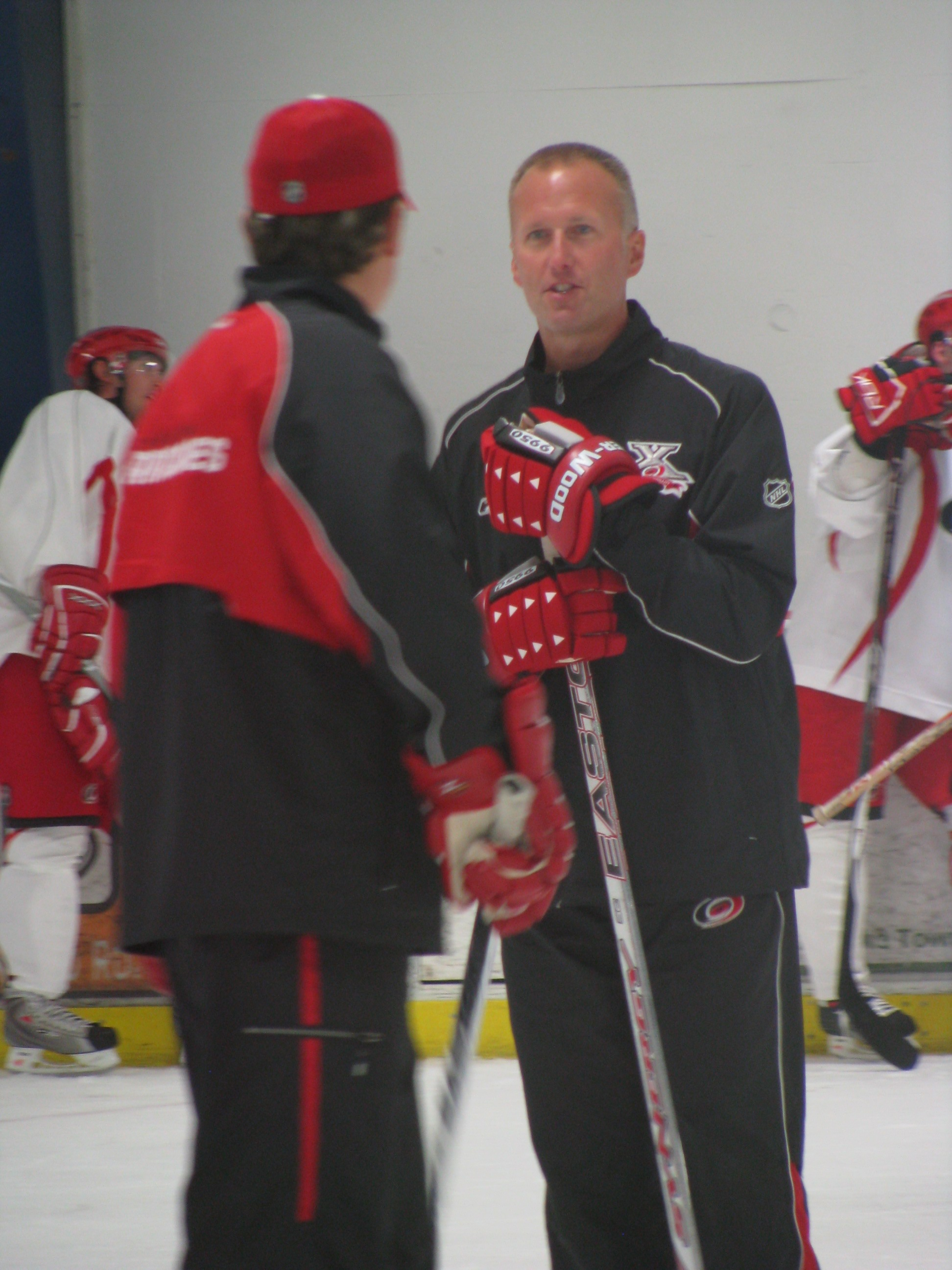
Barrasso (right) coaching with the Carolina Hurricanes in 2008

Barrasso was goaltending coach (2007–09) and later assistant coach (2009–11) of the Carolina Hurricanes. In the 2012–13 season he moved to KHL's Metallurg Magnitogorsk as assistant coach. During the Summer of 2015 Slovan Bratislava hired Barrasso as goaltending coach, but on October 31 he left the team and moved to Italy's Valpellice as head coach. The team won the Coppa Italia, but refused to join the newly founded Alps Hockey League. Barrasso, however, did not leave Italy: he moved to Asiago as head coach. Barrasso was named as head coach of the Sheffield Steelers in the EIHL in October 2018.

On 26 June 2021, Barrasso was named as head coach of HC Varese in the IHL

On November 26, 2024, Tom Barrasso was announced as the new Head Coach of the Hannover Scorpions, an ice hockey team competing in Germany's third-tier league. Based in Wedemark, Lower Saxony, the Scorpions aim to leverage Barrasso's extensive experience as they continue their pursuit of success in the league. He was fired on January 6, 2025, and replaced by Kevin Gaudet.

== Personal life ==
Barrasso and his wife Megan have three daughters, Ashley, Kelsey and Mallory. Barrasso founded the Ashley Barrasso Cancer Research Fund during the early 1990s after his oldest daughter survived a bout with neuroblastoma cancer. Ashley was originally diagnosed with cancer at the age of two, beating it through a bone marrow transplant at four before the cancer returned in June 2000. At the time of its reappearance, the adolescent survival rate for her cancer was 20%. In April 2000, doctors determined that Ashley would make a recovery. Barrasso's father, Tom Barrasso Sr., was diagnosed with an incurable brain tumor in April 1999 and died in January 2000. This combination of events caused Barrasso to lose interest in ice hockey and choose to not play in the 2000–01 season. Barrasso has since appeared in charity events to raise money for cancer research.

== Records ==
- Most NHL assists by a goaltender (career) – 48
- Most NHL points by a goaltender (career) – 48
- Shares record for most consecutive wins in one NHL regular season – 14 (March 9, 1993, to April 9, 1993)
- Most consecutive NHL playoff wins – 14 (May 9, 1992, to April 22, 1993)
- Shares record for most consecutive wins in one NHL playoff season – 11 in 1992 (shared with Ed Belfour (1992) and Patrick Roy (1993))
- Most playoff wins by an American goaltender – 61

== Career statistics ==
=== Regular season and playoffs ===
Bold indicates led league

| | | | Regular season | | | | | | | | | Playoffs |
| Season | Team | League | GP | W | L | T | MIN | GA | SO | GAA | SV% | GP | W | L | MIN | GA | SO | GAA | SV% |
|---|---|---|---|---|---|---|---|---|---|---|---|---|---|---|---|---|---|---|---|
| 1981–82 | Acton-Boxborough Colonials | High-MA | 23 | — | — | — | 1035 | 32 | 7 | 1.86 | — | — | — | — | — | — | — | — | — |
| 1982–83 | Acton-Boxborough Colonials | High-MA | 23 | 22 | 0 | 1 | 1035 | 17 | 10 | 0.99 | — | — | — | — | — | — | — | — | — |
| 1983–84 | Buffalo Sabres | NHL | 42 | 26 | 12 | 3 | 2475 | 117 | 2 | 2.84 | .893 | 3 | 0 | 2 | 139 | 8 | 0 | 3.45 | .864 |
| 1984–85 | Buffalo Sabres | NHL | 54 | 25 | 18 | **10** | 3248 | 144 | **5** | **2.66** | .887 | 5 | 2 | 3 | 300 | 22 | 0 | 4.40 | .854 |
| 1984–85 | Rochester Americans | AHL | 5 | 3 | 1 | 1 | 267 | 6 | 1 | 1.35 | .936 | — | — | — | — | — | — | — | — |
| 1985–86 | Buffalo Sabres | NHL | 60 | 29 | 24 | 5 | 3561 | 214 | 2 | 3.61 | .880 | — | — | — | — | — | — | — | — |
| 1986–87 | Buffalo Sabres | NHL | 46 | 17 | 23 | 2 | 2501 | 152 | 2 | 3.65 | .874 | — | — | — | — | — | — | — | — |
| 1987–88 | Buffalo Sabres | NHL | 54 | 25 | 18 | 8 | 3133 | 173 | 2 | 3.31 | .896 | 4 | 1 | 3 | 224 | 16 | 0 | 4.29 | .867 |
| 1988–89 | Buffalo Sabres | NHL | 10 | 2 | 7 | 0 | 545 | 45 | 0 | 4.95 | .842 | — | — | — | — | — | — | — | — |
| 1988–89 | Pittsburgh Penguins | NHL | 44 | 18 | 15 | 7 | 2406 | 162 | 0 | 4.04 | .888 | 11 | 7 | 4 | 641 | 40 | 0 | 3.80 | .897 |
| 1989–90 | Pittsburgh Penguins | NHL | 24 | 7 | 12 | 3 | 1294 | 101 | 0 | 4.68 | .865 | — | — | — | — | — | — | — | — |
| 1990–91 | Pittsburgh Penguins | NHL | 48 | 27 | 16 | 3 | 2754 | 165 | 1 | 3.59 | .896 | 20 | 12 | 7 | 1175 | 51 | **1** | **2.60** | **.919** |
| 1991–92 | Pittsburgh Penguins | NHL | 57 | 25 | 22 | 9 | 3329 | 196 | 1 | 3.53 | .885 | **21** | **16** | 5 | **1233** | 58 | 1 | 2.82 | .907 |
| 1992–93 | Pittsburgh Penguins | NHL | 67 | **43** | 14 | 5 | 3702 | 186 | 4 | 3.01 | .901 | 12 | 7 | 5 | 722 | 35 | **2** | 2.91 | .905 |
| 1993–94 | Pittsburgh Penguins | NHL | 44 | 22 | 15 | 5 | 2482 | 139 | 2 | 3.36 | .893 | 6 | 2 | 4 | 356 | 17 | 0 | 2.87 | .895 |
| 1994–95 | Pittsburgh Penguins | NHL | 2 | 0 | 1 | 1 | 125 | 8 | 0 | 3.84 | .893 | 2 | 0 | 1 | 80 | 8 | 0 | 6.00 | .805 |
| 1995–96 | Pittsburgh Penguins | NHL | 49 | 29 | 16 | 2 | 2799 | 160 | 2 | 3.43 | .902 | 10 | 4 | 5 | 558 | 26 | 1 | 2.80 | .923 |
| 1996–97 | Pittsburgh Penguins | NHL | 5 | 0 | 5 | 0 | 270 | 26 | 0 | 5.78 | .860 | — | — | — | — | — | — | — | — |
| 1997–98 | Pittsburgh Penguins | NHL | 63 | 31 | 14 | 13 | 3542 | 122 | 7 | 2.07 | .922 | 6 | 2 | 4 | 376 | 17 | 0 | 2.71 | .901 |
| 1998–99 | Pittsburgh Penguins | NHL | 43 | 19 | 16 | 3 | 2306 | 98 | 4 | 2.55 | .901 | 13 | 6 | 7 | 787 | 35 | 1 | 2.67 | .900 |
| 1999–2000 | Pittsburgh Penguins | NHL | 18 | 5 | 7 | 2 | 870 | 46 | 1 | 3.17 | .881 | — | — | — | — | — | — | — | — |
| 1999–2000 | Ottawa Senators | NHL | 7 | 3 | 4 | 0 | 418 | 22 | 0 | 3.16 | .879 | 6 | 2 | 4 | 372 | 16 | 0 | 2.58 | .905 |
| 2001–02 | Carolina Hurricanes | NHL | 34 | 13 | 12 | 5 | 1908 | 83 | 2 | 2.61 | .906 | — | — | — | — | — | — | — | — |
| 2001–02 | Toronto Maple Leafs | NHL | 4 | 2 | 2 | 0 | 219 | 10 | 0 | 2.50 | .909 | — | — | — | — | — | — | — | — |
| 2002–03 | St. Louis Blues | NHL | 6 | 1 | 4 | 0 | 293 | 16 | 1 | 3.28 | .879 | — | — | — | — | — | — | — | — |
| NHL totals | | | 777 | 369 | 277 | 86 | 44,180 | 2,385 | 38 | 3.24 | .892 | 119 | 61 | 54 | 6,953 | 349 | 6 | 3.01 | .902 |

=== International ===
| Year | Team | Event | Results | GP | W | L | T | MIN | GA | SO | GAA |
|---|---|---|---|---|---|---|---|---|---|---|---|
| 1983 | United States | WJC | 5th | 3 | — | — | — | 140 | 12 | 0 | 5.14 |
| 1984 | United States | CC | SF | 5 | 2 | 2 | 1 | 252 | 13 | 0 | 3.10 |
| 1986 | United States | WC | 6th | 5 | — | — | — | 260 | 18 | 0 | 4.15 |
| 1987 | United States | CC | Q | 1 | 0 | 1 | 0 | 60 | 5 | 0 | 5.00 |
| 2002 | United States | OG | 2nd place, silver medalist(s) | 1 | 1 | 0 | 0 | 60 | 1 | 0 | 1.00 |
| Junior totals | | | | 3 | — | — | — | 140 | 12 | 0 | 5.14 |
| Senior totals | | | | 12 | — | — | — | 632 | 37 | 0 | 3.51 |

== Awards and achievements ==
=== Awards ===
- 1984 – Calder Memorial Trophy (Top rookie in NHL)
- 1984 – Vezina Trophy (Top goaltender in NHL)
- 1984 – NHL First All-Star Team
- 1985 – NHL Second All-Star Team
- 1985 – William M. Jennings Trophy (Team with fewest goals allowed – shared with Bob Sauve)
- 1985 – Played in NHL All-Star Game
- 1991 – Stanley Cup champion (Pittsburgh Penguins)
- 1992 – Stanley Cup champion (Pittsburgh Penguins)
- 1993 – NHL Second All-Star Team
- 1994 Jaycees Ten Outstanding Young Americans
- 2003 – Member of the Pittsburgh Penguins Ring of Honor that formerly circled the Pittsburgh Civic Arena
- 2007 – Inducted into the National Italian American Sports Hall of Fame
- 2009 – Inducted into the U.S. Hockey Hall of Fame
- 2015 – Coppa Italia champion, (Hockey Club Valpellice)
- 2018 – Alps Hockey League champion, (Asiago Hockey AS)
- 2023 - Inducted into the Hockey Hall of Fame

=== Career achievements ===
- #3 in career NHL wins by a left-handed goaltender
- #4 in career NHL wins by a US-born Goaltender (369)
- #15 in career playoff wins (61, tied with Henrik Lundqvist).
- #20 all time in career regular season saves (19695).
- #21 career regular season wins (369).
- #1 points scored by an NHL goaltender (48).

Awards and achievements
| Preceded by Dave Andreychuk | Buffalo Sabres first-round draft pick 1983 | Succeeded by Normand Lacombe |
| Preceded by Steve Larmer | Winner of the Calder Memorial Trophy; 1984 | Succeeded by Mario Lemieux |
| Preceded by Pete Peeters | Winner of the Vezina Trophy; 1984 | Succeeded by Pelle Lindbergh |
