= 2002–03 Serie A (ice hockey) season =

Italian professional ice hockey season

The 2002–03 Serie A season was the 69th season of the Serie A, the top level of ice hockey in Italy. Six teams participated in the league, and the HC Milan Vipers won the championship by defeating Asiago Hockey in the final.

== Regular season ==
| | Club | GP | W | T | L | GF–GA | Pts |
|---|---|---|---|---|---|---|---|
| 1. | HC Milano Vipers | 40 | 23 | 9 | 8 | 165:91 | 56 |
| 2. | Asiago Hockey | 40 | 22 | 9 | 9 | 152:101 | 53 |
| 3. | HC Bozen | 40 | 15 | 15 | 10 | 123:121 | 46 |
| 4. | SHC Fassa | 40 | 13 | 10 | 17 | 127:143 | 32 |
| 5. | HC Meran | 40 | 9 | 8 | 23 | 114:158 | 26 |
| 6. | HC Alleghe | 40 | 9 | 7 | 24 | 111:176 | 25 |

== Playoffs ==
=== Semifinals ===
- HC Milano Vipers - SHC Fassa 3:0 (5:3, 4:1, 5:1)
- Asiago Hockey - HC Bozen 3:2 (5:2, 3:4 SO, 4:1, 0:1, 4:3 SO)

=== Final ===
- HC Milano Vipers - Asiago Hockey 4:2 (1:2, 3:2, 2:3 SO, 6:3, 4:1, 3:2 SO)
