= Andrè Signoretti =

Italian ice hockey player

Personal information
- Nationality: Italian
- Born: 16 January 1979 (age 46); Manotick, Ontario, Canada

Sport
- Sport: Ice hockey

Andrè Signoretti (born 16 January 1979) is an Italian ice hockey player. He competed in the men's tournament at the 2006 Winter Olympics.

== Career statistics ==
=== Regular season and playoffs ===
			Regular season					Playoffs
Season	Team	League	GP	G	A	Pts	PIM	GP	G	A	Pts	PIM
1995–96	Smiths Falls Bears	CJHL	50	6	12	18	46	—	—	—	—	—
1996–97	Smiths Falls Bears	CJHL	47	11	24	35	56	—	—	—	—	—
1997–98	Ohio State University	CCHA	41	5	20	25	67	—	—	—	—	—
1998–99	Ohio State University	CCHA	41	3	21	24	70	—	—	—	—	—
1999–2000	Ohio State University	CCHA	34	2	11	13	42	—	—	—	—	—
2000–01	Ohio State University	CCHA	16	3	10	13	48	—	—	—	—	—
2000–01	Charlotte Checkers	ECHL	27	0	9	9	8	—	—	—	—	—
2000–01	Houston Aeros	IHL	2	0	0	0	0	—	—	—	—	—
2001–02	Charlotte Checkers	ECHL	71	5	27	32	74	—	—	—	—	—
2002–03	HC Fassa	ITA	35	7	9	16	42	3	0	0	0	6
2003–04	HC Fassa	ITA	41	7	21	28	44	6	2	1	3	0
2004–05	HC Fassa	ITA	24	6	17	23	44	4	0	1	1	0
2005–06	SG Cortina	ITA	46	8	21	29	72	5	1	3	4	8
2006–07	Herning Blue Fox	DEN	36	4	19	23	40	15	5	3	8	40
2007–08	Herning Blue Fox	DEN	44	2	19	21	42	13	2	12	14	16
2008–09	SønderjyskE Ishockey	DEN	37	10	21	31	34	15	2	7	9	6
2009–10	ZSC Lions	NLA	4	0	0	0	0	2	0	2	2	4
2009–10	GCK Lions	SUI.2	37	5	28	33	40	—	—	—	—	—
2010–11	GCK Lions	SUI.2	38	4	19	23	38	—	—	—	—	—
2011–12	GCK Lions	SUI.2	33	4	15	19	58	5	0	2	2	2
2012–13	GCK Lions	SUI.2	38	4	28	32	54	4	0	1	1	4
2013–14	HC Asiago	ITA	18	3	14	17	20	7	0	1	1	16
2014–15	HC Valpellice	ITA	27	10	10	20	36	4	1	2	3	16
2015–16	HC Valpellice	ITA	41	5	20	25	42	7	0	2	2	6
ITA totals			232	46	112	158	300	36	4	10	14	52
DEN totals			117	16	59	75	116	43	9	22	31	62
SUI.2 totals			146	17	90	107	190	9	0	3	3	6

=== International ===
Year	Team	Event	GP	G	A	Pts	PIM
2005	Italy	WC D1	5	0	1	1	4
2006	Italy	OG	4	0	0	0	2
2007	Italy	WC	4	0	1	1	0
2008	Italy	WC	4	1	2	3	6
Senior totals			17	1	4	5	12

"André Signoretti". Elite Prospects.

== Awards and honors ==
Award	Year
All-CCHA Second Team	1998–99
