= Franz Josef Plankl =

Italian ice hockey coach

- Born: October 12, 1989 (age 36) Bolzano, Italy
- Height: 6 ft 1 in (185 cm)
- Weight: 183 lb (83 kg; 13 st 1 lb)
- Position: Left Wing
- Shot: Left
- Played for: Serie A: Ritten Sport; Serie A2/B: HC Future Bozen; HC Gherdëina; EV Bozen 84; HC Neumarkt-Egna; HC Merano
- Playing career: 2006–2017

Franz Josef Plankl (born October 12, 1989) is an Italian ice hockey coach and former left wing. He is currently assistant coach of HC Merano in the Serie B.
