= 2015–16 Serie A (ice hockey) season =

Italian professional ice hockey season

The 2015–16 Serie A season was the 82nd season of the Serie A, the top level of ice hockey in Italy. 8 teams participated in the league, and Asiago Hockey won the championship. Ritten Sport won the League Cup.

== Regular season ==
	Club	GP	W	OTW	OTL	L	GF–GA	Pts
1.	Ritten Sport	42	29	5	3	5	153:68	100
2.	HC Pustertal	42	27	4	2	9	167:111	91
3.	Asiago Hockey	42	19	3	5	15	154:133	68
4.	WSV Sterzing Broncos	42	18	4	5	15	126:119	67
5.	HC Fassa	42	14	3	7	18	118:131	55
6.	HC Valpellice	42	11	4	4	23	92:140	45
7.	HC Gherdëina	42	9	6	5	22	98:156	44
8.	SG Cortina	42	8	4	2	28	111:161	34
