= Giorgio de Bettin =

Italian ice hockey player (born 1972)

Giorgio De Bettin
- Born: 7 August 1972 (age 53) Pieve di Cadore, Italy
- Height: 5 ft 9 in (175 cm)
- Weight: 185 lb (84 kg; 13 st 3 lb)
- Position: Right wing
- Shot: Right
- Played for: USG Zoldo; Asiago; HC Courmaosta; SG Cortina; HC Milano
- National team: Italy
- Playing career: 1991–2015

Giorgio de Bettin (born 7 August 1972 in Pieve di Cadore, Italy) is an Italian former professional ice hockey player. He is currently the head coach for SG Cortina of the Alps Hockey League (AlpsHL).

de Bettin played in Italian Hockey League - Serie A for USG Zoldo, Asiago, HC Courmaosta, SG Cortina and HC Milano.

He was also a member of the Italy national team. He participated at the 2002, 2006, 2007, 2008 and 2010 IIHF World Championship, as well as the 2006 Winter Olympics.
