= Supercoppa Italiana (ice hockey) =

National ice hockey cup in Italy

The Supercoppa Italiana is the national ice hockey supercup in Italy. It was first played in 2001, and is contested by the previous season's Serie A and Coppa Italia champions.

== Champions ==
Year	Date	Champion	Score	Runner-up	Location
2001	22 September	Asiago Hockey	1–3	HC Milano Vipers	Asiago
2002	24 September	HC Milano Vipers	5–2	Asiago Hockey	Milan
2003	23 September	HC Milano Vipers	0–1	Asiago Hockey	Milan
2004	24 September	HC Milano Vipers	3–5	HC Bolzano	Milan
2005	not played				
2006	1 October	HC Milano Vipers	6–2	Ritten Sport	Milan
2007	7 October	SG Cortina	0–1	HC Bolzano	Cortina d'Ampezzo
2008	20 September	HC Bolzano	6–3	SG Pontebba	Bolzano
2009	17 September	HC Bolzano	1–5	Ritten Sport	Collalbo
2010	16 September	Asiago Hockey	0–3	Ritten Sport	Asiago
2011	21 September	Asiago Hockey	1–3	Val Pusteria	Bruneck
2012	18 September	HC Bolzano	4–3 SO	SG Cortina	Cortina d’Ampezzo
2013	17 October	Asiago	1–0	Valpellice	Hodegart
2014	18 September	Ritten Sport	3–4	Val Pusteria	Arena Ritten
2015	17 September	Asiago Hockey	2–1	Ritten Sport	Hodegart
2016	11 September	Ritten Sport	1–3	Val Pusteria	Arena Ritten
2017	14 October	Ritten Sport	8–3	Hockey Milano Rossoblu	Stadio del Ghiaccio Agorà
2018	4 October	Ritten Sport	5–4 OT	Hockey Milano Rossoblu	Stadio del Ghiaccio Agorà
2019	11 September	Ritten Sport	7–2	SV Kaltern	Arena Ritten
2020	4 September	Asiago Hockey	4–2	HC Merano	Asiago
2021	2 September	Asiago Hockey	4–1	Hockey Unterland - Cavaliers	Neumarkt
2022	6 September	Asiago Hockey	4–3 OT	Hockey Unterland - Cavaliers	Neumarkt

== Titles by team ==
- Asiago Hockey (6): 2003, 2013, 2015, 2020, 2021, 2022
- Ritten Sport (5): 2009, 2010, 2017, 2018, 2019
- HC Bolzano (4): 2004, 2007, 2008, 2012
- HC Milano Vipers (3): 2001, 2002, 2006
- Val Pusteria (2): 2014, 2016
- HC Pustertal (1): 2011
