= Luca Ansoldi =

Italian ice hockey player

- Born: January 5, 1982 (age 44) Merano, Italy
- Height: 6 ft 0 in (183 cm)
- Weight: 203 lb (92 kg; 14 st 7 lb)
- Position: Right wing
- Shoots: Right
- Italy2 team Former teams: HC Merano; Ritten Sport; SG Cortina; HC Bolzano; Hockey Milano Rossoblu
- National team: Italy
- Playing career: 1999–present

Luca Ansoldi (born January 5, 1982, in Merano, Italy) is an Italian professional ice hockey player currently playing for HC Merano of the Italian Hockey League. He has previously played in Serie A for Ritten Sport, SG Cortina, HC Bolzano and Hockey Milano Rossoblu.

Ansoldi participated at the 2006, 2007, 2008, 2010 and 2012 IIHF World Championship as a member of the Italian national team. He also played in the 2006 Winter Olympics.
