= Oly Hicks =

Canadian-Italian ice hockey coach

Christopher "Oly" Hicks
- Born: July 31, 1968 (age 58) Calgary, Alberta, Canada
- Height: 5 ft 11 in (180 cm)
- Weight: 185 lb (84 kg; 13 st 3 lb)
- Position: Defence
- Shot: Left
- Played for: Richmond Renegades (ECHL)
- NHL draft: Beer League
- Playing career: 1993–2000

Christopher "Oly" Hicks (born July 31, 1968) is a Canadian-Italian ice hockey coach. He is currently the Director of Hockey Operations with the Val Pusteria Wolves of the Italian Elite.A.

Hicks played junior hockey in the British Columbia Hockey League, followed by a professional career that saw him play briefly in the ECHL, and also in Austria, before he turned his attention to coaching.

From 2001 to 2008, Hicks served as a coach within the Manhattanville College ice hockey program. Starting with the 2008–09 season, Hicks moved to Italy to become the head coach of the Vipiteno Broncos, then playing in Italy's second level - the Serie A2. Under Hicks' coaching, the team was twice the Serie A2 champion (2009 and 2011), and received a promotion to play the 2011–12 season in the Serie A, before being relegated back to the Serie A2 for the 2012–13 season.

== Championships ==
- 2008-09: Serie A2 Champion with the Vipiteno Broncos
- 2010-11: Serie A2 Champion with the Vipiteno Broncos- Promotion to Serie A
