= Hockey Unterland Cavaliers =

- City: Neumarkt, South Tyrol, Italy
- League: Alps Hockey League
- Founded: 2019
- Home arena: Würth Arena
- Colors: Blue, silver

Championships
- IHL: 2022

Hockey Unterland Cavaliers are an Italian professional ice hockey team based in Neumarkt/Egna. The club is currently a member of the Alps Hockey League and plays their home games at the Würth Arena.

== History ==
After the dissolution of HC Neumarkt-Egna in 2018, the city was without a professional ice hockey team until the foundation of Hockey Unterland in 2019. The Cavaliers began as members of the Italian second league and were able to quickly ascent despite the upheaval caused by the COVID-19 pandemic. In just its second season, Unterland finished second in the regular season while the next year saw the club win the league championship. With a great deal of confidence in the team, Unterland moved up to the Alps Hockey League, the spiritual successor to the Italian first league.

Unterland didn't skip a beat in their first year in the AHL, finishing second in the regular season. However, the team stumbled come playoff time and they were bounced out in the Quarterfinals. After that, the club flagged for the next two years and ended up missing the postseason entirely in 2025.

== Season-by-season results ==
Season	GP	W	OTW	OTL	L	Pts	GF	GA	Finish	Playoffs
Italian Hockey League
2019–20	20	5	2	2	11	21	61	84	9th of 11, IHL	Did not qualify
2020–21	16	9	1	0	6	29	51	42	2nd of 10, IHL	Won Quarterfinal series, 3–1 (Valdifiemme Hockey Club); Lost Semifinal series, 2–3 (SV Kaltern)
2021–22	18	10	1	1	5	33	69	45	4th of 10, IHL	Winners Round-Robin Qualifier, 6–0–2–0; 1st of 5 Won Quarterfinal series, 4–1 (HC Varese); Won Semifinal series, 4–1 (Hockey Pergine); Won Championship series, 4–2 (Valdifiemme Hockey Club)
Alps Hockey League
2022–23	28	17	3	0	8	57	104	80	2nd of 15, AHL	Winners Round-Robin Qualifier, 2–1–0–5; 5th of 5 Lost Quarterfinal series, 0–4 (Red Bull Hockey Juniors)
2023–24	30	10	3	5	12	41	105	105	t-9th of 16, AHL	Won Losers Round-Robin Group B Qualifier, 5–0–1–2; 2nd of 5 Won Eighthfinal series, 2–0 (HC Gherdëina); Lost Quarterfinal series, 1–4 (Red Bull Hockey Juniors)
2024–25	36	12	4	7	13	51	105	123	8th of 13, AHL	Lost Losers Round-Robin Group B Qualifier, 2–0–1–3; 4th of 4
