= Coppa Italia (ice hockey) =

Italian ice hockey tournament

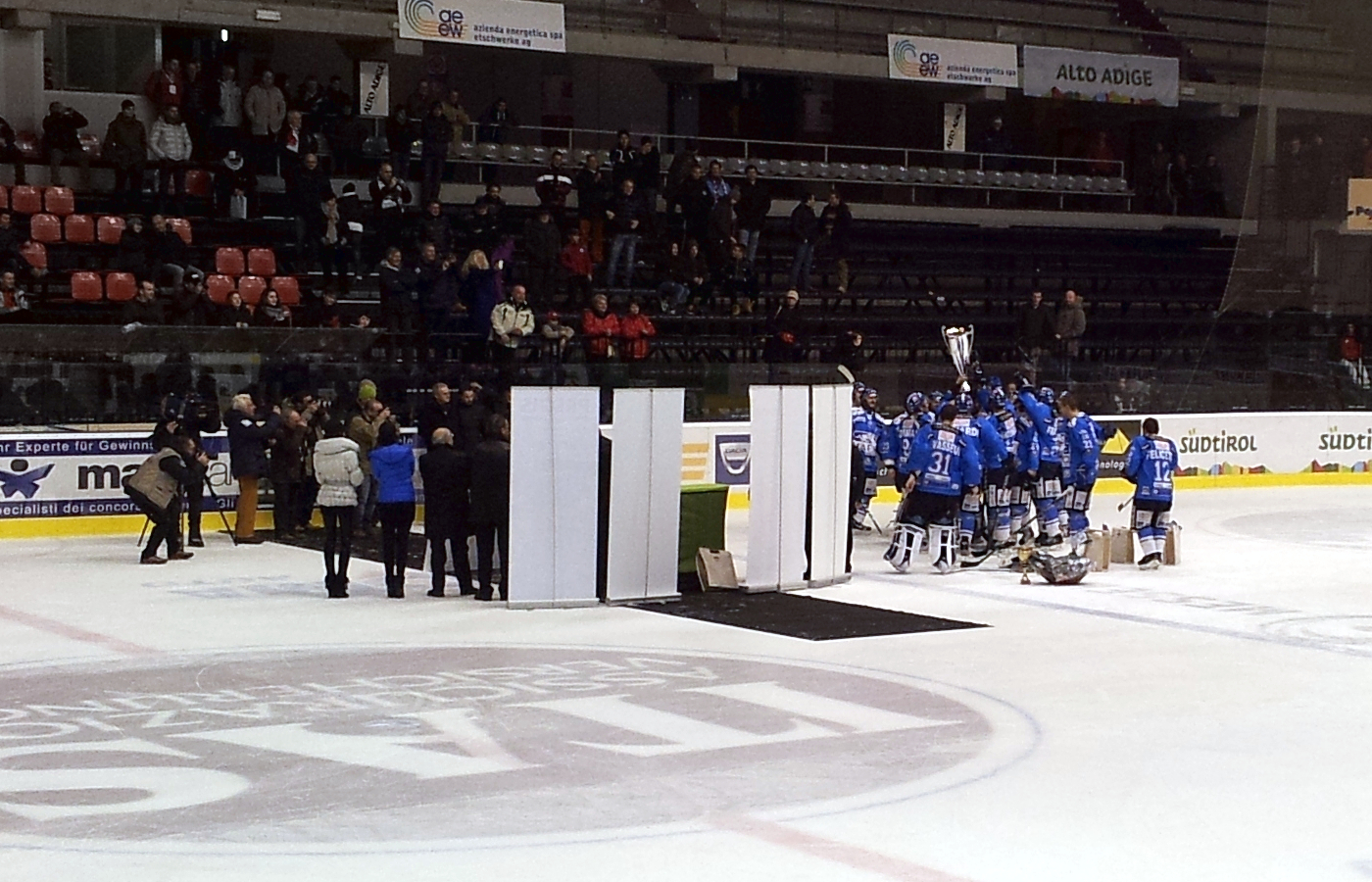
SG Cortina wins Coppa Italia in 2012

The Coppa Italia is the national ice hockey cup in Italy. It was first played in 1973.

== Winners ==
- 1973: Sportivi Ghiaccio Cortina
- 1974: Sportivi Ghiaccio Cortina
- 1991: Associazione Sportiva Asiago Hockey
- 1998: HC CourmAosta
- 2000–01: Associazione Sportiva Asiago Hockey
- 2001–02: Associazione Sportiva Asiago Hockey
- 2002–03: Hockey Club Junior Milano Vipers
- 2003–04: Hockey Club Bolzano
- 2004–05: Hockey Club Junior Milano Vipers
- 2005–06: Hockey Club Junior Milano Vipers
- 2006–07: Hockey Club Bolzano
- 2007–08: Sport Ghiaccio Pontebba
- 2008–09: Hockey Club Bolzano
- 2009–10: AS Renon
- 2010–11: HC Pustertal
- 2011–12: Sportivi Ghiaccio Cortina
- 2012–13: HC Valpellice
- 2013–14: AS Renon
- 2014–15: AS Renon
- 2015–16: HC Valpellice
- 2016–17: Hockey Milano Rossoblu
- 2017–18: Hockey Milano Rossoblu
- 2018–19: SV Kaltern
- 2019–20: HC Merano
- 2020–21: Hockey Unterland Cavaliers
- 2021–22: Hockey Unterland Cavaliers
- 2022–23: HC Varese
- 2023–24: Hockey Pergine
- 2024–25: Feltreghiaccio

== Titles by team ==
- SG Cortina (3): 1973, 1974, 2011–12
- HC Bolzano (3): 2003–04, 2006–07, 2008–09
- Asiago Hockey (3): 1991, 2000–01, 2001–02
- HC Milano Vipers (3): 2002–03, 2004–05, 2005–06
- AS Renon (3): 2009–10, 2013–14, 2014–15
- HC Valpellice (2): 2012–13, 2015–16
- Hockey Milano Rossoblu (2): 2016–17, 2017–18
- SG Pontebba (1): 2007–08
- HC Courmaosta (1): 1998
- HC Pustertal (1): 2010–11
- SV Kaltern (1): 2018–19
- HC Merano (1): 2019–20
- HC Varese (1): 2022–23
- Hockey Pergine (1): 2023–24
- Feltreghiaccio (1): 2024–25
