= Milano Vipers =

Defunct ice hockey team from Italy

- HCJ Milano Vipers
- Sport: Ice hockey
- Founded: 1998
- Folded: June 2008
- League: Italian Hockey League - Serie A
- Team history: Milano Vipers (2000–2008); Hockey Club Junior Milano (1998–2000)
- Location: Milan, Italy
- Championships: 5
- League titles: 6
- Website: Official website (archive)

Hockey Club Junior Milano Vipers was an Italian professional ice hockey team from Milan. Founded in 1998 as Hockey Club Junior Milano, was renamed Vipers in 2000.

In June 2008 the organization was disbanded and replaced with Hockey Milano Rossoblu, a new club that employs much of the same office staff, but does not benefit from the same fundings and operates on a significantly tighter budget.

During their short history, the Vipers won 5 Scudetti, 3 Italy Cups and 3 Italian Super Cups.
