= HC Lions Courmaosta =

Italian ice hockey team

- City: Courmayeur, Italy
- League: Serie A2
- Founded: 1933
- Home arena: Courmayeur Arena
- Colours: White, Yellow, Black

The HC Lions Courmaosta were an Italian ice hockey team based in Courmayeur. The club was founded in 1933. They played in the Serie A, the top level of ice hockey in Italy. The club folded in 1999.

== Achievements ==
- Coppa Italia champion: 1998
