= Christian Borgatello =

Italian ice hockey player

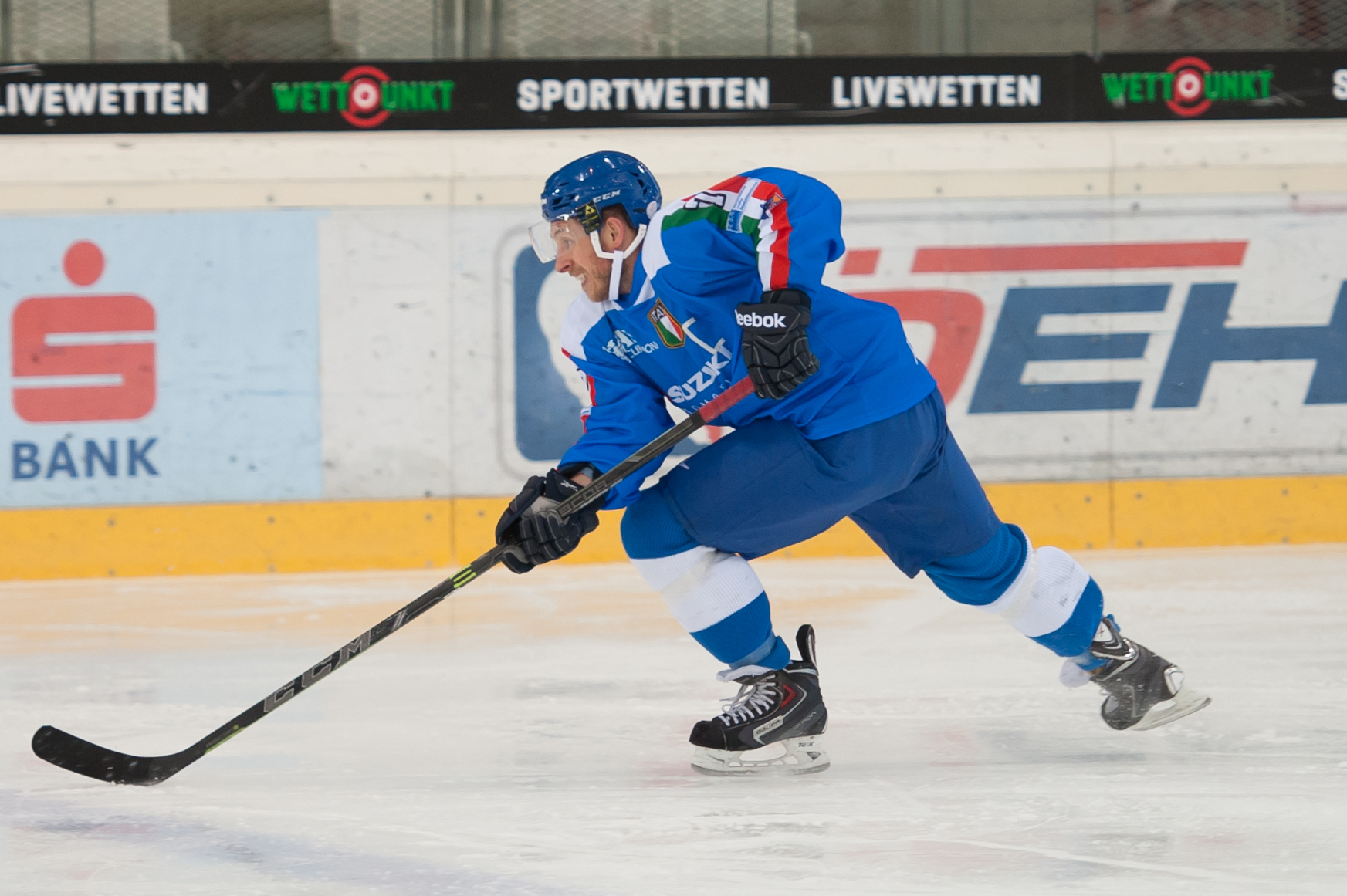
- Born: February 10, 1982 (age 44) Merano, Italy
- Height: 5 ft 9 in (175 cm)
- Weight: 174 lb (79 kg; 12 st 6 lb)
- Position: Defence
- Shoots: Right
- Serie A team: Bolzano-Bozen Foxes
- National team: Italy
- NHL draft: Undrafted
- Playing career: 1999–present

Christian Borgatello (born February 10, 1982) is an Italian professional ice hockey defenceman who participated at the 2010 IIHF World Championship as a member of the Italy men's national ice hockey team.

Borgatello was born in Merano, Italy.
