= Alps Hockey League =

International ice hockey league in Central Europe

- Sport: Ice hockey
- Founded: 21 May 2016
- First season: 2016–17
- No. of teams: 13
- Countries: Austria (4 teams); Croatia (1 team); Italy (7 teams); Slovenia (1 team)
- Continent: Europe
- Most recent champions: Gherdëina (1st title) (2025–26)
- Most titles: Asiago; Olimpija; Ritten (all 2 titles)
- Related competitions: Austrian Hockey League; Inter-National League; Serie A
- Website: Official website

The Alps Hockey League (AlpsHL) is a professional ice hockey league based in Central Europe. The league is made up of teams from Austria, Croatia, Italy and Slovenia. It was established in 2016 as a result of a merger between Serie A and the Inter-National League.

== Formation ==
The Alps Hockey League was founded in spring 2016 as a joint venture between the Austrian Ice Hockey Association, the Italian Ice Sports Federation, and the Ice Hockey Federation of Slovenia. The three national governing bodies have stated that they are keen to ensure that the league is both of a high standard, and financially viable in the long term. In addition, the league has also stated that it is open to teams from other nations, including the Czech Republic, Germany and Slovakia.

Regarding players, each team can sign a maximum four foreign-born players. The AlpsHL operates on a points-based system, with each team having 36 points available, of which a maximum of 16 can be spent on foreign players. As a result of this, the league aims to focus on the development of young players from the participating countries.

== Teams ==
In the 2026–27 season, the AlpsHL consists of 13 teams, with 7 teams from Italy, 4 from Austria, and 1 each from Croatia and Slovenia.

Location of the 2026–27 teams

Austria

- (Austria) KAC Future Team (Note: Youth team of EC KAC)
- (Austria) Kitzbühel
- (Austria) Red Bull Hockey Juniors (Note: Youth team of Red Bull Salzburg)
- (Austria) Zeller Eisbären

Croatia

- (Croatia) Sisak

Italy

- (Italy) Asiago
- (Italy) Cortina
- (Italy) Gherdëina
- (Italy) Hockey Unterland
- (Italy) Merano
- (Italy) Ritten
- (Italy) Wipptal Broncos

Slovenia

- (Slovenia) Jesenice

== List of seasons ==
Season	Champions	Runners-up	Series
2016–17	(Italy) Ritten	(Italy) Asiago	4–1
2017–18	(Italy) Asiago	(Italy) Ritten	4–3
2018–19	(Slovenia) Olimpija	(Italy) Pustertal Wölfe	4–3
2019–20	Cancelled due to the COVID-19 pandemic		
2020–21	(Slovenia) Olimpija	(Italy) Asiago	3–0
2021–22	(Italy) Asiago	(Slovenia) Jesenice	3–2
2022–23	(Slovenia) Jesenice	(Italy) Cortina	4–2
2023–24	(Italy) Ritten	(Italy) Cortina	4–0
2024–25	(Austria) Zeller Eisbären	(Slovenia) Jesenice	4–1
2025–26	(Italy) Gherdëina	(Italy) Merano	4–0

== See also ==
- Interliga (1999–2007)
- Alpenliga
