= Wipptal Broncos =

- City: Sterzing, Italy
- League: Alps Hockey League
- Founded: 1948
- Home arena: Weihenstephan Arena
- Colours: Blue, black
- Head coach: Johan Sjöquist
- Website: www.broncos.it

The Wipptal Broncos (Wintersportverein Sterzing Vipiteno) are a professional ice hockey team founded in 1948, in Sterzing in South Tyrol, northern Italy, playing in the Alps Hockey League and formerly the Serie A.

Coached by Christopher Oly Hicks, they played the 2011–12 season in the Serie A, the highest level of ice hockey in Italy, before being relegated back to the Serie A2 for the 2012–13 season.

== Achievements ==
- Serie A runners-up: 1998
- Serie A2 champions: 2005, 2009, 2011

== See also ==
- Category:Wipptal Broncos players
