= Ritten Sport =

Rittner Buam
- City: Ritten, Italy
- League: Alps Hockey League
- Founded: 1928; 98 years ago
- Home arena: Ritten Arena
- Colours: Blue, red
- Head coach: Tray Tuomie
- Website: Rittnerbuam.com

Franchise history
- 1984–2004: SV Ritten
- 2004–present: Ritten Sport (Rittner Buam)

Rittner Buam is a professional Italian ice hockey team from Ritten, playing in the Alps Hockey League and formerly the Serie A.

== History ==
The club under the name SV Renon (Ritten Sportverein) was founded in 1984. In 2004, the name was changed to Sport Renon (Ritten Sport) and Ritten Sport Hockey.

Ritten Sport plays its home games in the 1,200-seat Arena Ritten in Klobenstein. During the 2010 playoffs, the "Palaonda" in Bolzano was used.

== Honours ==
Domestic competitions

- Serie A

Winners (6): 2013–14, 2015–16, 2016–17, 2017–18, 2018–19, 2023–24

- Serie B

Winners (1): 1986, 1999

- Coppa Italia

Winners (3): 2009–10, 2013–14, 2014–15

- Supercoppa Italiana

Winners (4): 2009, 2010, 2017, 2018, 2019

International competitions

- Alps Hockey League

Winners (2): 2016–17, 2023–24
Runners-up (1): 2017–18
