= Asiago Hockey 1935 =

- City: Asiago, Veneto, Italy
- League: Alps Hockey League; Serie A
- Founded: 1935; 91 years ago
- Home arena: Pala Hodegart
- Colors: Yellow, red
- Head coach: Giorgio De Bettin
- Media: Official website

Championships
- Playoff championships: 9 Italian Championships; 2 Alps Hockey Leagues; 3 Italian Cups; 6 Italian Supercups

Asiago Hockey 1935 is an Italian professional ice hockey team from Asiago which plays in the Alps Hockey League and the Serie A. The club has won the national championship nine times.

== Honours ==
Domestic

- Italian Hockey League - Serie A

Winners (9): 2000–01, 2009–10, 2010–11, 2012–13, 2014–15, 2019–20, 2020–21, 2021–22, 2025–26

- Coppa Italia

Winners (3): 1991, 2000–01, 2001–02

- Supercoppa Italiana

Winners (6): 2003, 2013, 2015, 2020, 2021, 2022

International

- Alps Hockey League

Winners (2): 2017–18, 2021–22
