= HC Merano =

HC Meran/o
- City: Merano, Italy
- League: Alps Hockey League
- Founded: 1968; 58 years ago
- Home arena: Meranarena
- Colours: Black, white
- Head coach: Massimo Ansoldi
- Website: http://www.hcm-junior.it/

HC Merano is a professional ice hockey team in Merano, Italy. They play in the Alps Hockey League

== History ==
Merano was founded in 1968. They won the Serie A twice, in 1986 and 1999. Since 2004 the club is playing in the 2nd highest league in Italy.

=== Honours ===
- Serie A champion : 1986, 1999
- Serie A2 champion: 1971, 1978, 1991
- Serie B champion: 2016
- Serie C champion: 2009

== Notable players ==
- Rick Morocco
