= 2024–25 Italian Hockey League season =

- League: Italian Hockey League
- Sport: Ice hockey
- Duration: 21 September 2024 – 10 April 2025
- Number of games: Regular season: 156; Qualification: 72; Postseason: 28
- Number of teams: 13

Regular season
- Season champions: SV Kaltern
- Runners-up: HC Aosta

Playoffs
- Finals champions: SV Kaltern
- Runners-up: HC Aosta

Italian Hockey League seasons
- ← 2023–24 2025–26 →

The 2024–25 Italian Hockey League season was the 73rd season of play for second-tier professional ice hockey in Italy. The regular season ran from 21 September to 29 December 2024 with SV Kaltern finishing atop the standings. Postseason qualification ran from 4 January to 22 February 2025 with SV Kaltern earning the top overall seed for the playoffs. The Postseason ran from 1 March to 10 April 2025. SV Kaltern defeated HC Aosta 4 games to 2 for the league championship.

== Membership changes ==
- Ares Sport Aosta won the IHL Division 1 championship in 2024, earning a promotion to the IHL for this season. As part of the move, the club rebranded as Hockey Club Aosta.
- In April, the HC Fassa Falcons announced that they were withdrawing from the Alps Hockey League and would be joining the Italian Hockey League for this season. The team cited increased cost as the sole reason for their move.

== Teams ==
2024–25 Italian Hockey League teams.

Team	City	Arena	Coach
Alleghe Hockey	Alleghe	Palaghiaccio Alvise De Toni	(Finland) Vesa Surenkin
HC Aosta	Aosta	Palazzo del Ghiaccio di Aosta	(Italy) Luca Giovinazzo
HC Falcons Brixen	Brixen	Palaghiaccio di Bressanone	(United States) Ken Eddy
HC Fassa Falcons	Canazei	Stadio del Ghiaccio Gianmario Scola	(Italy) Luigi Marchetti
ValdiFiemme HC	Cavalese	Stadio del ghiaccio - Cavalese	(Italy) Marco Allevato, (Italy) Luca Felicetti
Hockey Como	Como	Stadio del ghiaccio	(Italy) Massimo Da Rin
HC Eppan Pirates	Eppan	Eisstadion Eppan	(Canada) Martin Lacroix
HC Feltre	Feltre	PalaFeltre - Palazzo del Ghiaccio	(Czech Republic) Martin Ekrt
SV Kaltern	Kaltern	Raiffeisen Arena Kaltern	(Finland) Teemu Virtala
A.S.D. Hockey Pergine	Pergine Valsugana	Stadio del ghiaccio di Pergine	(Italy) Andrea Ambrosi
HC Valpellice	Torre Pellice	Palaghiaccio Olimpico	(Canada) Dino Grossi
HC Varese	Varese	PalAlbani	(Slovenia) Gaber Glavič
HC 3 Zinnen Dolomites	Toblach	Eislaufplatz Toblach	(Finland) Tommy Flinck

== Standings ==
=== Regular season ===
Pos	Team	Pld	W	OTW	OTL	L	GF	GA	GD	Pts	Qualification
1	SV Kaltern	24	19	2	2	1	105	45	+60	63	Advanced to Winners Round
2	HC Aosta	24	18	3	0	3	160	70	+90	60	Advanced to Winners Round
3	HC Feltre	24	14	3	3	4	116	84	+32	51	Advanced to Winners Round
4	HC Varese	24	14	4	0	6	112	76	+36	50	Advanced to Winners Round
5	HC Eppan Pirates	24	12	1	1	10	88	81	+7	39	Advanced to Winners Round
6	Alleghe Hockey	24	11	1	1	11	69	73	−4	36	Advanced to Winners Round
7	A.S.D. Hockey Pergine	24	8	2	4	10	92	90	+2	32	Advanced to Losers Round
8	HC 3 Zinnen Dolomites	24	9	1	1	13	80	104	−24	30	Advanced to Losers Round
9	HC Valpellice	24	8	2	1	13	80	83	−3	29	Advanced to Losers Round
10	ValdiFiemme HC	24	8	1	3	12	74	91	−17	29	Advanced to Losers Round
11	HC Fassa Falcons	24	6	1	3	14	85	104	−19	23	Advanced to Losers Round
12	HC Falcons Brixen	24	4	0	2	18	69	135	−66	14	Advanced to Losers Round
13	Hockey Como	24	3	1	1	19	57	151	−94	12	Advanced to Losers Round

Source: Alps Hockey League
Rules for classification: 1) Points; 2) Head-to-head points.

=== Playoff qualification ===
==== Master round ====
Home \ Away	ALL	AOS	EPP	FEL	KAL	VAR	ALL	AOS	EPP	FEL	KAL	VAR
Alleghe Hockey	—	4–6	4–2	4–5 ^{(OT)}	0–2	7–2	—	2–3	4–5 ^{(OT)}	7–2	1–3	6–3
HC Aosta	6–4	—	9–0	7–2	2–4	3–5	3–2	—	3–6	7–2	2–4	5–4 ^{(SO)}
HC Eppan Pirates	2–4	0–9	—	2–5	1–6	0–6	5–4 ^{(OT)}	6–3	—	2–7	1–4	3–4 ^{(SO)}
HC Feltre	5–4 ^{(OT)}	2–7	5–2	—	2–4	3–5	2–7	2–7	7–2	—	3–2	6–1
SV Kaltern	2–0	4–2	6–1	4–2	—	3–2	3–1	4–2	4–1	2–3	—	3–4 ^{(OT)}
HC Varese	2–7	5–3	6–0	5–3	2–3	—	3–6	4–5 ^{(SO)}	4–3 ^{(SO)}	1–6	4–3 ^{(OT)}	—

Updated to match(es) played on Final. Source: Alps Hockey League
Legend: Blue = home team win; Yellow = draw; Red = away team win.

Pos	Team	Pld	W	OTW	OTL	L	GF	GA	GD	Pts	Qualification
1	SV Kaltern (Note: SV Kaltern retained 21 points from regular season from common games.)	10	8	0	1	1	35	18	+17	46	Advanced to playoff quarterfinals
2	HC Aosta (Note: HC Aosta retained 20 points from regular season from common games.)	10	6	1	0	3	50	30	+20	40	Advanced to playoff quarterfinals
3	HC Feltre (Note: HC Feltre retained 17 points from regular season from common games.)	10	5	1	0	4	39	39	0	34	Advanced to playoff quarterfinals
4	HC Varese (Note: HC Varese retained 16 points from regular season from common games.)	10	3	2	1	4	39	36	+3	30	Advanced to playoff quarterfinals
5	Alleghe Hockey (Note: Alleghe Hockey retained 12 points from regular season from common games.)	10	3	0	2	5	34	38	−4	23	Advanced to playoff quarterfinals
6	HC Eppan Pirates (Note: HC Eppan Pirates retained 13 points from regular season from common games.)	10	0	1	1	8	19	55	−36	16	Advanced to playoff quarterfinals

Updated to match(es) played on unknown. Source: Alps Hockey League
Rules for classification: 1) Points; 2) Head-to-head points.

==== Losers round ====
Home \ Away	BRI	COM	FAS	FIE	PER	VAL	ZIN	BRI	COM	FAS	FIE	PER	VAL	ZIN
HC Falcons Brixen	—	2–0	2–11	1–9	1–4	1–8	1–3	—	1–7	1–4	3–6	3–6	0–8	4–8
Hockey Como	0–2	—	1–4	1–9	2–4	3–5	2–3	7–1	—	0–12	0–4	2–4	1–6	1–2
HC Fassa Falcons	11–2	4–1	—	5–3	5–3	5–3	6–0	4–1	12–0	—	3–4	2–3	1–3	4–0
ValdiFiemme HC	9–1	9–1	3–5	—	7–2	7–3	5–2	6–3	4–0	4–3	—	3–5	2–3 ^{(OT)}	6–2
A.S.D. Hockey Pergine	4–1	4–2	3–5	2–7	—	1–3	1–4	6–3	4–2	3–2	5–3	—	5–0	6–3
HC Valpellice	8–1	5–3	3–5	3–7	3–1	—	5–3	8–0	6–1	3–1	3–2 ^{(OT)}	0–5	—	4–1
HC 3 Zinnen Dolomites	3–1	3–2	0–6	2–5	4–1	3–5	—	8–4	2–1	0–4	2–6	3–6	1–4	—

Updated to match(es) played on Final. Source: Alps Hockey League
Legend: Blue = home team win; Yellow = draw; Red = away team win.

Pos	Team	Pld	W	OTW	OTL	L	GF	GA	GD	Pts	Qualification
1	ValdiFiemme HC (Note: ValdiFiemme HC retained 9 points from regular season from common games.)	12	9	0	1	2	65	30	+35	37	Advanced to playoff quarterfinals
2	HC Valpellice (Note: HC Valpellice retained 9 points from regular season from common games.)	12	8	1	0	3	51	30	+21	35	Advanced to playoff quarterfinals
3	HC Fassa Falcons (Note: HC Fassa Falcons retained 7 points from regular season from common games.)	12	9	0	0	3	62	23	+39	34	
4	A.S.D. Hockey Pergine (Note: A.S.D. Hockey Pergine retained 10 points from regular season from common games.)	12	8	0	0	4	44	35	+9	34	
5	HC 3 Zinnen Dolomites (Note: HC 3 Zinnen Dolomites retained 10 points from regular season from common games.)	12	5	0	0	7	31	45	−14	25	
6	Hockey Como (Note: Hockey Como retained 4 points from regular season from common games.)	12	1	0	0	11	20	56	−36	7	
7	HC Falcons Brixen (Note: HC Falcons Brixen retained 4 points from regular season from common games.)	12	1	0	0	11	20	74	−54	7	

Updated to match(es) played on unknown. Source: Italian Hockey League
Rules for classification: 1) Points; 2) Head-to-head points.

=== Statistics ===
==== Scoring leaders ====
Player	Team	Pos	GP	G	A	Pts	PIM
(Czech Republic) Martin Kadlec	HC Feltre	C/RW	32	41	52	93	67
(Finland) Markus Korkiakoski	HC Feltre	C/LW	34	33	52	85	34
(Finland) Niklas Salo	HC Fassa Falcons	LW/RW	36	35	49	84	8
(United States) Nick Nardella	HC Aosta	RW	32	33	48	81	14
(Ukraine) Andriy Mikhnov	HC Fassa Falcons	C/LW	35	25	42	67	10
(Canada) Christian Buono	HC Aosta	F	32	23	40	63	65
(Ukraine) Dmitri Nimenko	HC Aosta	C/LW	34	15	46	61	12
(Canada) Carmine Buono	HC Aosta	D	32	15	45	60	40
(Slovakia) Jozef Foltin	HC Feltre	LW	33	27	29	56	22
(Mexico) Hector Majul	HC Valpellice	F	35	28	27	55	30
(United States) Daniel Eruzione	HC Eppan Pirates	F	32	20	35	55	46

==== Leading goaltenders ====
The following goaltenders led the league in goals against average, provided that they have played at least 1/3 of their team's minutes.

Player	Team	GP	TOI	W	L	GA	SO	SV%	GAA
(Italy) Samuel Rohregger	SV Kaltern	17	1028	15	2	30	3	.919	1.75
(Italy) Alex Andergassen	SV Kaltern	17	1024	14	3	33	3	.901	1.93
(Ukraine) Sergei Pisarenko	HC Fassa Falcons	26	1490	14	9	61	3	.931	2.46
(Italy) Alessandro Tura	HC Aosta	15	770	9	3	34	1	.902	2.65
(Italy) Andrea Basraoui	HC Valpellice	28	1658	18	10	81	2	.908	2.93

== Playoffs ==
=== Bracket ===
Quarterfinals (best-of-5)
1	SV Kaltern	3	10	9	-	-
8	HC Valpellice	0	3	1	-	-
2	HC Aosta	9	3	2	5	-
7	ValdiFiemme HC	1	4*	0	2	-
(Pairings are re-seeded after the first round)
3	HC Feltre	3	2	7	4*	-
6	HC Eppan Pirates	5	1	2	3	-
4	HC Varese	4	4	4	-	-
5	Alleghe Hockey	1	1	1	-	-

Semifinals (best-of-5)
1	SV Kaltern	3	3	2	1	4
4	HC Varese	0	2	3*	2*	2
2	HC Aosta	5	4	6	-	-
3	HC Feltre	2	2	4	-	-

Championship (best-of-7)
1	SV Kaltern	1	0	3	2**	3	7	-
2	HC Aosta	2*	2	2	1	2	4	-

Note: * denotes overtime Note: ** denotes overtime and shootout
