= David Hale (ice hockey) =

American ice hockey player (born 1981)

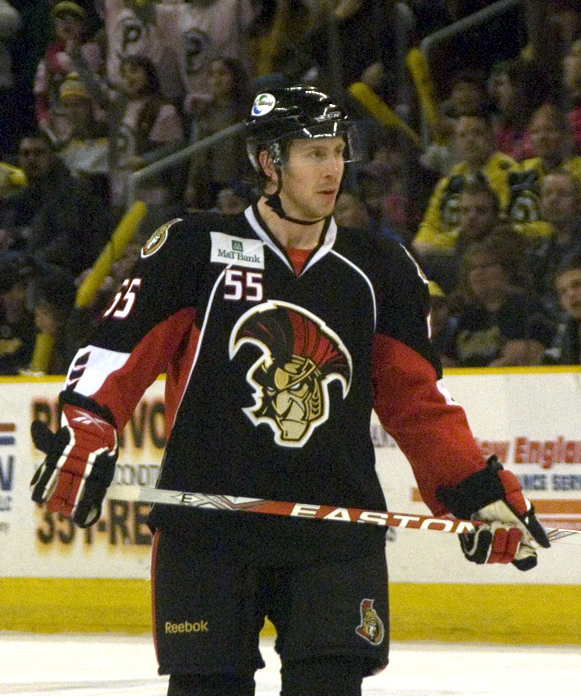
- Hale with the Binghamton Senators in 2011
- Born: June 18, 1981 (age 45) Colorado Springs, Colorado, U.S.
- Height: 6 ft 2 in (188 cm)
- Weight: 220 lb (100 kg; 15 st 10 lb)
- Position: Defense
- Shot: Left
- Played for: New Jersey Devils; Calgary Flames; Phoenix Coyotes; Tampa Bay Lightning; Ottawa Senators
- National team: United States
- NHL draft: 22nd overall, 2000; New Jersey Devils
- Playing career: 2003–2014

David M. Hale (born June 18, 1981) is an American former professional ice hockey player. He played for the New Jersey Devils, Calgary Flames, Phoenix Coyotes, Tampa Bay Lightning and Ottawa Senators over an eight-year National Hockey League (NHL) career. Hale is noteworthy for holding the record for most games needed to score his first NHL goal, with it taking him 231 games, scoring it in his 6th professional season.

== Playing career ==
Hale, a Colorado Springs native, played high school hockey for Coronado High School before joining Sioux City Musketeers of the USHL. He was drafted from the Musketeers in the first round, 22nd overall by the New Jersey Devils in the 2000 NHL entry draft before joining the University of North Dakota to play collegiate hockey in the Western Collegiate Hockey Association.

Hale made his NHL debut on October 8, 2003.

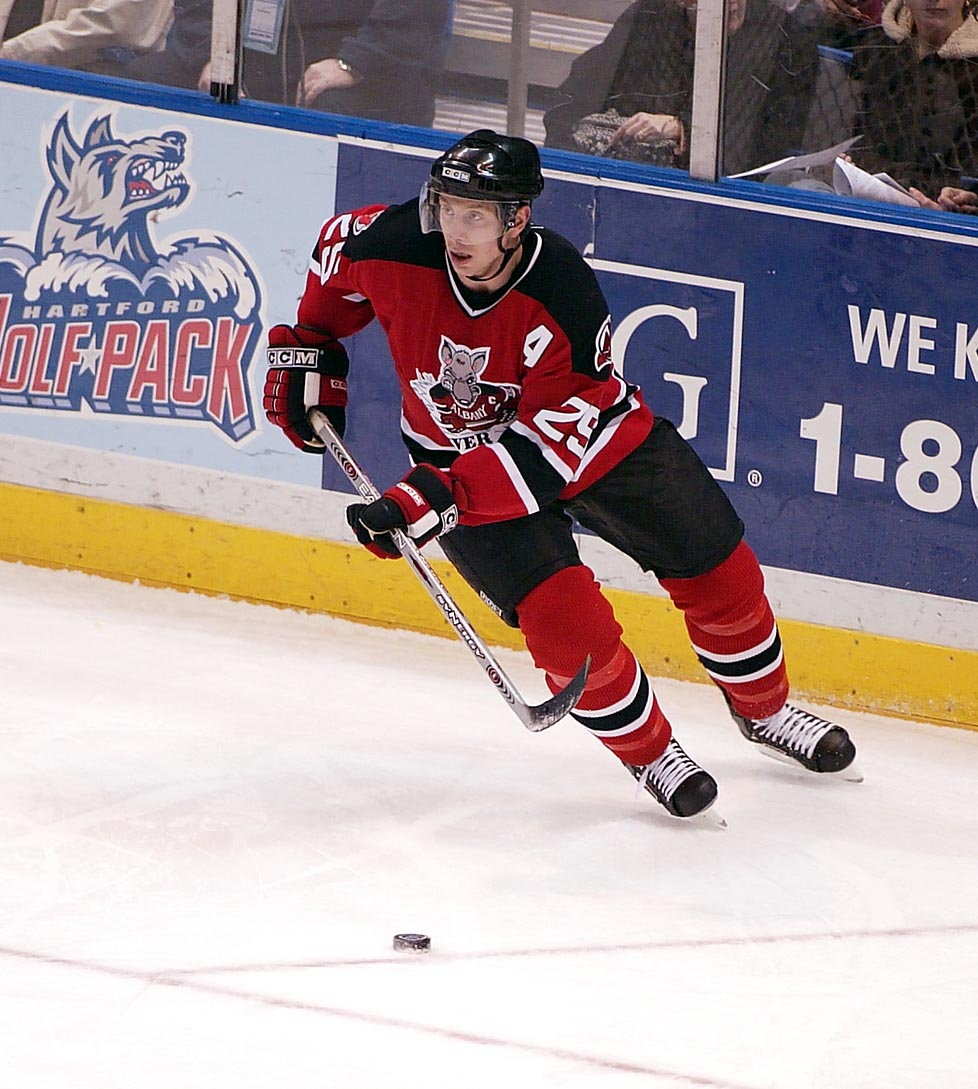
Hale with the Albany River Rats in 2005

On February 27, 2007, Hale was traded by the Devils, along with a 2007 fifth-round draft pick, to the Calgary Flames for a 2007 third-round draft pick.

On July 3, 2008, Hale, a free agent, signed with the Phoenix Coyotes on a two-year deal. During the 2008–09 season on November 26, 2008, Hale scored his first NHL goal in a 3–2 victory against the Columbus Blue Jackets. Hale scored in his 231st game, setting a record for the longest start to an NHL career without a goal.

On July 21, 2009, Hale was traded by the Coyotes, along with Todd Fedoruk, to the Tampa Bay Lightning for Radim Vrbata. Used as a depth defenseman Hale played sparingly in 35 games, before he was reassigned to AHL affiliate, the Norfolk Admirals, on a conditioning assignment. In his last game with the Admirals, Hale broke his foot and returned to Tampa to play in just 4 more games to end the 2009–10 season.

On August 4, 2010, Hale signed a one-year contract with the Ottawa Senators. Hale split the season between Ottawa and their AHL team, the Binghamton Senators. Hale finished the season with Ottawa, and did not take part in Binghamton's Calder Cup playoff run.

On October 15, 2011, Hale officially announced his retirement from hockey.

On June 26, 2013, Hale signed with Italian team HC Appiano, in the semi-pro Inter-National League.

== Career statistics ==
=== Regular season and playoffs ===
| | | | Regular season | | | | | Playoffs |
| Season | Team | League | GP | G | A | Pts | PIM | GP | G | A | Pts | PIM |
|---|---|---|---|---|---|---|---|---|---|---|---|---|
| 1997–98 | Coronado High School | HS-CO | 25 | 11 | 33 | 44 | 154 | — | — | — | — | — |
| 1998–99 | Sioux City Musketeers | USHL | 56 | 3 | 15 | 18 | 127 | 5 | 0 | 0 | 0 | 18 |
| 1999–2000 | Sioux City Musketeers | USHL | 54 | 6 | 18 | 24 | 187 | 5 | 0 | 2 | 2 | 6 |
| 2000–01 | North Dakota Fighting Sioux | WCHA | 44 | 4 | 5 | 9 | 79 | — | — | — | — | — |
| 2001–02 | North Dakota Fighting Sioux | WCHA | 34 | 4 | 5 | 9 | 63 | — | — | — | — | — |
| 2002–03 | North Dakota Fighting Sioux | WCHA | 26 | 2 | 6 | 8 | 49 | — | — | — | — | — |
| 2003–04 | New Jersey Devils | NHL | 65 | 0 | 4 | 4 | 72 | 1 | 0 | 0 | 0 | 0 |
| 2004–05 | Albany River Rats | AHL | 30 | 2 | 3 | 5 | 39 | — | — | — | — | — |
| 2005–06 | New Jersey Devils | NHL | 38 | 0 | 4 | 4 | 21 | 8 | 0 | 2 | 2 | 12 |
| 2005–06 | Albany River Rats | AHL | 30 | 2 | 5 | 7 | 64 | — | — | — | — | — |
| 2006–07 | New Jersey Devils | NHL | 43 | 0 | 1 | 1 | 26 | — | — | — | — | — |
| 2006–07 | Lowell Devils | AHL | 2 | 0 | 1 | 1 | 0 | — | — | — | — | — |
| 2006–07 | Calgary Flames | NHL | 11 | 0 | 0 | 0 | 10 | 2 | 0 | 0 | 0 | 6 |
| 2007–08 | Calgary Flames | NHL | 58 | 0 | 2 | 2 | 46 | 6 | 0 | 0 | 0 | 2 |
| 2008–09 | Phoenix Coyotes | NHL | 48 | 3 | 6 | 9 | 36 | — | — | — | — | — |
| 2009–10 | Tampa Bay Lightning | NHL | 39 | 0 | 4 | 4 | 25 | — | — | — | — | — |
| 2009–10 | Norfolk Admirals | AHL | 4 | 1 | 1 | 2 | 0 | — | — | — | — | — |
| 2010–11 | Binghamton Senators | AHL | 36 | 2 | 4 | 6 | 32 | — | — | — | — | — |
| 2010–11 | Ottawa Senators | NHL | 25 | 1 | 4 | 5 | 6 | — | — | — | — | — |
| 2013–14 | HC Appiano | INL | 30 | 5 | 14 | 19 | 65 | — | — | — | — | — |
| 2013–14 | HC Appiano | ITA.2 | 4 | 0 | 1 | 1 | 4 | — | — | — | — | — |
| NHL totals | | | 327 | 4 | 25 | 29 | 242 | 17 | 0 | 2 | 2 | 20 |

=== International ===
| Year | Team | Event | GP | G | A | Pts | PIM |
|---|---|---|---|---|---|---|---|
| 2001 | United States | WJC | 7 | 0 | 2 | 2 | 6 |
| Junior totals | | | 7 | 0 | 2 | 2 | 6 |

== Awards and honors ==
| Award | Year |
|---|---|
| All-WCHA Third Team | 2002–03 |

Sporting positions
| Preceded by Ari Ahonen | New Jersey Devils first-round draft pick 2000 | Succeeded by Adrian Foster |
