= Drahomír Kadlec =

Czech former ice hockey defenceman

- Born: 29 November 1965 (age 60) Příbram, Czechoslovakia
- Height: 5 ft 11 in (180 cm)
- Weight: 189 lb (86 kg; 13 st 7 lb)
- Position: Defence
- Shot: Right
- Played for: Czech Extraliga; HC Kladno; HC Dukla Jihlava; HC Zlín; HC Litvínov; HC Slezan Opava; SM-liiga; HIFK; TapparaDEL; Kaufbeurer Adler; 2nd Bundesliga; EC Bad Tölz; Serie A HC Neumarkt-Egna
- National team: Czechoslovakia and Czech Republic
- NHL draft: 245th overall, 1988; Philadelphia Flyers
- Playing career: 1979–1989
Medal record
Men's ice hockey
Representing Czechoslovakia
Olympic Games
Bronze medal – third place	1992 Albertville	Team competition

Drahomír Kadlec (born 29 November 1965) is a Czech former ice hockey defenceman.

Kadlec played in the Czech Extraliga for HC Kladno, HC Dukla Jihlava, HC Zlín, HC Litvínov and HC Slezan Opava. He also played in Finland's SM-liiga for HIFK and Tappara, the Deutsche Eishockey Liga and the 2nd Bundesliga in Germany for Kaufbeurer Adler and EC Bad Tölz as well as Italy's Serie A for HC Neumarkt-Egna.

Kadlec played on the 1992 Bronze Medal winning Olympic ice hockey team for Czechoslovakia.

== Career statistics ==
=== Regular season and playoffs ===
			Regular season					Playoffs
Season	Team	League	GP	G	A	Pts	PIM	GP	G	A	Pts	PIM
1984–85	Poldi SONP Kladno	CZE.2	39	2	8	10	28	4	1	1	2	8
1985–86	Poldi SONP Kladno	TCH	33	3	5	8	30	—	—	—	—	—
1986–87	ASD Dukla Jihlava	TCH	40	7	2	9	26	—	—	—	—	—
1987–88	ASD Dukla Jihlava	TCH	42	5	11	16	44	—	—	—	—	—
1988–89	Poldi SONP Kladno	TCH	34	7	14	21	46	—	—	—	—	—
1989–90	Poldi SONP Kladno	TCH	49	8	21	29	64	—	—	—	—	—
1990–91	HIFK	SM-l	42	3	10	13	36	3	1	1	2	24
1991–92	HIFK	SM-l	44	4	20	24	30	9	2	6	8	6
1992–93	HIFK	SM-l	48	11	20	31	39	4	0	0	0	0
1993–94	ESV Kaufbeuren	1.GBun	44	13	10	23	18	4	0	2	2	2
1994–95	Kaufbeurer Adler	DEL	43	9	26	35	36	3	1	2	3	2
1995–96	Kaufbeurer Adler	DEL	46	8	25	33	32	—	—	—	—	—
1996–97	Kaufbeurer Adler	DEL	29	5	9	14	12	—	—	—	—	—
1996–97	HC ZPS-Barum Zlín	ELH	18	1	7	8	8	—	—	—	—	—
1997–98	HC Chemopetrol, a.s.	ELH	35	4	14	18	46	2	0	1	1	0
1998–99	HC Opava	ELH	47	1	9	10	40	—	—	—	—	—
1999–2000	Tappara	SM-l	5	0	0	0	0	—	—	—	—	—
1999–2000	EC Bad Tölz	DEU.2	36	5	24	29	10	—	—	—	—	—
2000–01	EC Bad Tölz	DEU.2	40	4	16	20	30	14	1	4	5	10
2001–02	Tölzer Löwen	DEU.2	48	5	28	33	20	1	0	0	0	0
2002–03	Tölzer Löwen	DEU.2	46	5	32	37	58	—	—	—	—	—
2003–04	HC Neumarkt-Egna	ITA	40	13	9	22	34	—	—	—	—	—
2004–05	HC Neumarkt-Egna	ITA.2	35	9	26	35	36	7	0	7	7	10
2005–06	HC Neumarkt-Egna	ITA.2	34	6	24	30	62	4	0	2	2	16
TCH totals			198	30	53	83	210	—	—	—	—	—
SM-l totals			139	18	50	68	105	16	3	7	10	32
DEL totals			118	22	60	82	80	3	1	2	3	2

=== International ===
Year	Team	Event	GP	G	A	Pts	PIM
1985	Czechoslovakia	WJC	7	1	2	3	2
1987	Czechoslovakia	WC	5	0	2	2	2
1987	Czechoslovakia	CC	3	0	1	1	12
1989	Czechoslovakia	WC	9	0	0	0	10
1990	Czechoslovakia	WC	9	1	1	2	4
1992	Czechoslovakia	OG	8	1	4	5	6
1992	Czechoslovakia	WC	8	2	2	4	10
1993	Czech Republic	WC	8	3	1	4	14
1994	Czech Republic	OG	8	0	2	2	4
1994	Czech Republic	WC	6	1	1	2	0
1996	Czech Republic	WC	8	1	3	4	2
1996	Czech Republic	WCH	2	0	0	0	0
Senior totals			74	9	17	26	54
