= Nick Bonino =

American ice hockey player (born 1988)

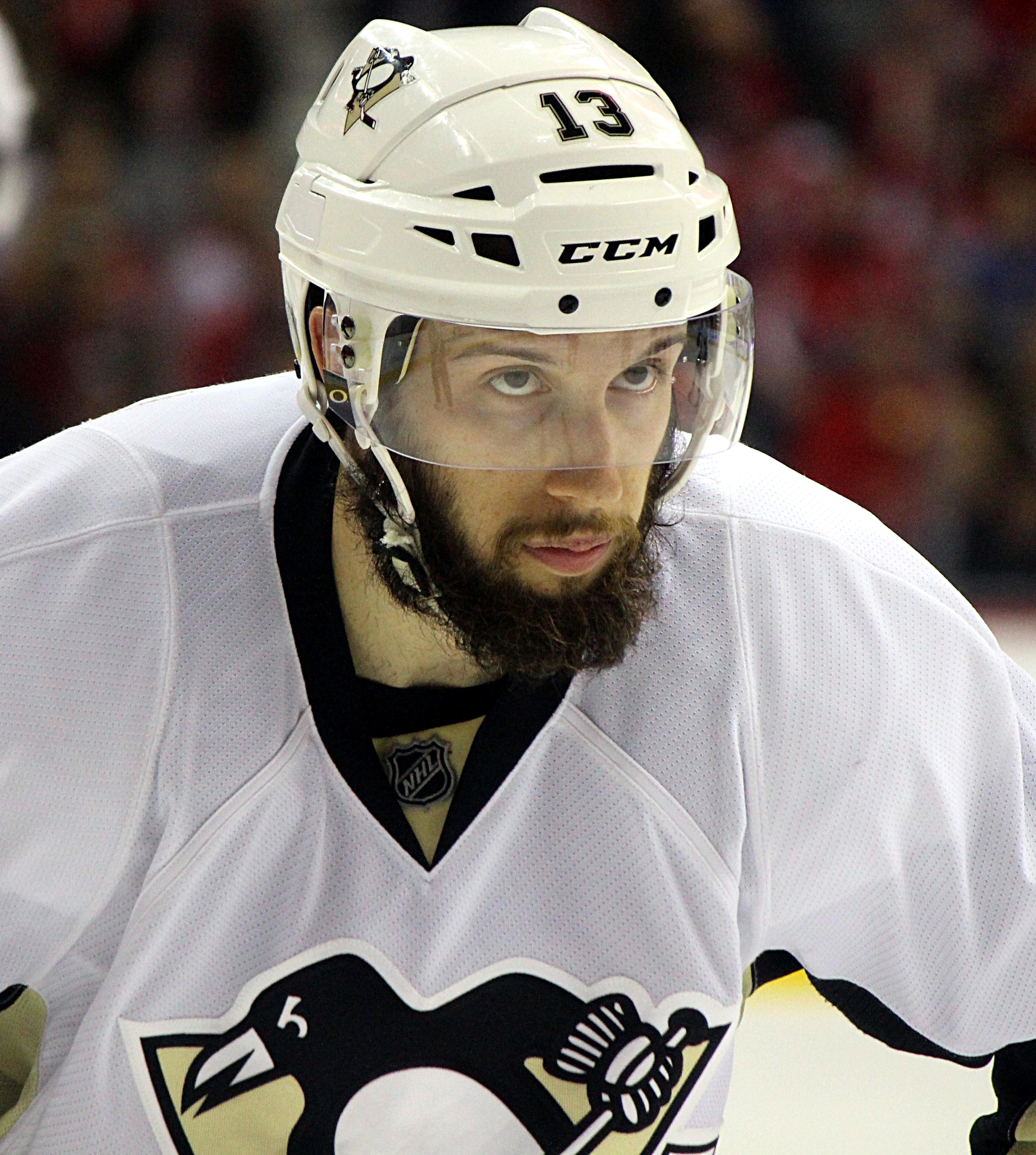
- Bonino with the Pittsburgh Penguins in 2016
- Born: April 20, 1988 (age 38) Newington, Connecticut, U.S.
- Height: 6 ft 1 in (185 cm)
- Weight: 195 lb (88 kg; 13 st 13 lb)
- Position: Center
- Shot: Left
- Played for: Anaheim Ducks; Vancouver Canucks; Pittsburgh Penguins; Nashville Predators; Minnesota Wild; San Jose Sharks; New York Rangers; HK Olimpija
- National team: United States
- NHL draft: 173rd overall, 2007; San Jose Sharks
- Playing career: 2010–2025

Nicholas Bonino (born April 20, 1988) is an American former professional ice hockey player. He was a center for 15 seasons in the National Hockey League (NHL) for the Anaheim Ducks, Vancouver Canucks, Pittsburgh Penguins, Nashville Predators, Minnesota Wild, San Jose Sharks, and New York Rangers, as well as one season in the ICE Hockey League (ICEHL) for HK Olimpija. Bonino represented the United States three times, winning a bronze medal twice.

Prior to beginning his collegiate career at Boston University, Bonino was drafted in the sixth round, 173rd overall, in the 2007 NHL entry draft by the San Jose Sharks. However, his playing rights were traded to the Anaheim Ducks before he could sign or play for the team. Bonino played three seasons with the Boston University Terriers before embarking on his professional career with the Ducks. Although he played with the HC Neumarkt-Egna during the 2012–13 NHL lockout, Bonino spent the majority of five years within the Ducks system before being traded to the Vancouver Canucks. His tenure with the Canucks spanned one season before he was traded to the Pittsburgh Penguins.

Bonino became a significant member of the Pittsburgh Penguins and played a huge factor in the Pittsburgh Penguins becoming the first back to back Stanley Cup champions of the salary cap era. His play in the 2016 Stanley Cup playoffs was a significant factor in the Pittsburgh Penguins winning the Stanley Cup as he led the team in assists. Along with his linemates Phil Kessel and Carl Hagelin, the trio was nicknamed the HBK line and noted for their strong play during the playoffs.

== Early life ==
Bonino was born on April 20, 1988, in Newington, Connecticut, to Joanne and Steven Bonino. His mother is a speech therapist while his father works for BellSimons, an air conditioning system supplier. As a youth, Bonino played with the Connecticut Clippers Peewee Minor team and he helped them win the 2002 Atlantic Youth Hockey League playoffs. He finished his tenure with the team holding their all-time record in goals, assists, and points.

== Playing career ==
=== Minor ===
Bonino began his high school career at Farmington High School in Connecticut before transferring to Avon Old Farms. While at Farmington, Bonino played under the tutelage of Mike Barone while leading the school to its first state championship. In his junior year, Bonino scored three goals to lift Farmington over North Branford for the NHC Tournament title. He later scored another hat-trick to lead Farmington to the a CIAC Division II boys' hockey finals against Trumbull. His play as a sophomore drew attention from University of Maine men's assistant coach Grant Standbrook and Avon Old Farms coach John Gardner. Although he impressed Gardner with his playmaking ability, the coach was concerned with his skating skills. In spite of this, Bonino led the team to its first state championship by scoring the game-winning goal with 12:28 left in the second overtime.

After scoring a state single-season record 68 goals, Bonino transferred to Avon Old Farms for his senior year. While at Avon Old Farms, Bonino captained the team to the New England Prep championship in 2007. As a member of this team, he played on a line with brothers Tom and Cam Atkinson to win the Avon Old Farms Christmas Hockey Classic over The Frederick Gunn School. He also committed to play collegiate ice hockey at Boston University for the men's ice hockey team on a hockey scholarship after offers from Providence, New Hampshire, Yale, and Union. Leading up to the 2007 NHL entry draft, Bonino was ranked 117th among North American Skaters in the NHL Central Scouting Bureaus Mid-Term Rankings. Bonino was eventually drafted by the San Jose Sharks in the sixth round, 173rd overall.

=== Collegiate ===
Bonino played for the Boston University Terriers at Boston University from 2007 to 2010. There, he enrolled in the university's College of Arts and Sciences. Bonino made his collegiate debut on October 13, 2007, where he tallied two assists in the 4–4 tie with the Alaska Anchorage Seawolves. He later scored his first collegiate goal in a 6–2 loss to the Michigan Wolverines on October 27. Bonino was recognized as the Hockey East Rookie of the Week on November 5 after he combined for three points in two contests against the UMass Lowell River Hawks, including the game-winning goal. The following month, Bonino recorded his first multi-goal game in a 4–3 loss over the River Hawks. In February, Bonino and the Terriers went 8–1–0 and its lone loss to Boston College did not count against them in the Hockey East standings. Bonino finished his freshman season playing in 39 of 40 games and ranking fifth on the team in scoring with 16 goals and 13 assists for 29 points.

Bonino returned to the Terriers for the 2008–09 season, where he broke out offensively to help lead the team to the 2009 NCAA National Championship. The Terriers began the season strong by winning the Ice Breaker Invitational title over the Michigan State Spartans. Following the tournament, Bonino, and Colin Wilson were named to the All-Ice Breaker team. Through the first seven games of the season, Bonino and Wilson tied for the conference lead in scoring with 12 apiece and tied for third nationally in points per game, at 1.71. Although he was producing, the Terrier's coach Jack Parker noticed that his defensive game was lacking and subsequently benched him for one game. Upon returning to the lineup, Bonino recorded five goals and an assist over his next six games. Bonino's success continued into the annual Beanpot tournament where he helped the Terriers erase a 2–0 deficit against the Harvard Crimson and scored the first of three shorthanded goals in a 5–2 win over the Northeastern Huskies. His efforts during the tournament earned him the 2009 Beanpot MVP and Co-Player of the Week honors.

Bonino finished the month of February tallying multiple points in five contests to lead the team with 14 points. He continued strong into March by remaining on the Terrier's top line with John McCarthy and Brandon Yip. Bonino tallied a career-best five points, while the line combined for 12 points, in an 8–2 road win over the Providence Friars on March 5. Bonino subsequently became the first Terrier in nearly 11 seasons to record a five-point game. The Terriers finished with an 18–5–4 record in conference play while Bonino finished with 18 goals and 32 assists for 50 points. As the Terriers qualified for the 2009 NCAA Division I men's ice hockey tournament, Bonino helped lead the team to their first Frozen Four in 12 years and was subsequently named to the All-Tournament Team with teammates Matt Gilroy, Kieran Millan, and Jason Lawrence. He then led the team to an NCAA National Championship over Miami University by first providing an assist to Zach Cohen to bring the Terriers within one goal, and then by scoring the game-tying goal with 17.4 seconds left in the third period to force overtime. While competing in the tournament, Bonino's playing rights were traded to the Anaheim Ducks with goaltender Timo Pielmeier in exchange for Travis Moen and Kent Huskins on March 4, 2009.

Prior to the 2009–10 season, the Terriers lost eight members from their national championship squad but kept five players who had tallied at least 23 points. Despite this, the USA Today/USA Hockey Magazine Men's College Hockey Preseason Poll ranked Boston University third amongst collegiate hockey teams. Bonino was specifically singled out for Inside College Hockey's 2009–10 Preseason All-America Second Team. While entering his junior season with these high expectations, Bonino went scoreless in his first two games of the season before being sidelined with a shoulder injury. He recovered in 21 days and tallied two assists in his return to the Terrier's lineup to secure a 6–4 win over the Merrimack Warriors. Bonino continued to produce offensively following this game and recorded six goals and 12 assists through the next 22 games to rank second on the team in scoring behind Kevin Shattenkirk. On January 29, Bonino became the 77th Terrier in program history to record 100 career points after he tallied three assists in a win over the UMass Minutemen. At the time, he also ranked fourth in career points among active Hockey East players.

=== Professional ===
==== Anaheim Ducks ====
Bonino concluded his collegiate career on March 21, 2010, by signing a two-year, entry-level contract with the Anaheim Ducks. After signing with Anaheim, he immediately joined the team and replaced Ryan Getzlaf in the lineup to make his NHL debut on March 26, 2010, in a game against the Edmonton Oilers. He scored his first career NHL goal in Anaheim's next game against the Dallas Stars; the goal was assisted by Teemu Selänne. He finished the year playing in nine games and registering one goal and one assist with six penalty minutes.

Bonino returned to the Ducks for their 2010 Conditioning Camp prior to the 2010–11 season. After attending their training camp, Bonino was reassigned to the Ducks' American Hockey League (AHL) affiliate, the Syracuse Crunch, to start the season. He began the season strong by tallying two goals and seven assists through his first eight games for Syracuse to lead all rookies in assists and ranked tied for second in scoring. His playing efforts were recognised by the coaching staff and he earned his first NHL recall of the season on November 1. Upon joining the Ducks, Bonino played on a line with fellow rookie Kyle Palmieri and veteran Todd Marchant. However, he soon suffered a foot injury in December following a win over the Boston Bruins and was listed as day-to-day. Once he recovered, he played in two more games but was reassigned to the AHL after he remained pointless. While playing with Palmieri in March, Bonino accumulated four goals and 14 assists for 18 points in his final 14 games. He finished the regular season tied for fifth in assists and tied for 11th in scoring while also leading the team in assists and plus/minus. As the Ducks qualified for the 2011 Stanley Cup playoffs, Bonino was recalled again and made his post-season debut in Game 2 against the Nashville Predators. He played a third-line center role between Matt Beleskey and Brandon McMillan as the Ducks were forced to change their lineup following Bobby Ryan's suspension. Once the Ducks were eliminated from playoff contention, Bonino signed a one-year deal to remain with the Ducks on July 15, 2011.

As with the previous season, Bonino was reassigned to the AHL after attending the Ducks training camp prior to the start of the 2011–12 season. He began the season strong by leading the Crunch with two goals and 11 points over their first nine games. He was soon recalled to the NHL level on October 31 while Jean-François Jacques was assigned to the Crunch. He made his season debut the following day against the Washington Capitals, playing 11 minutes, 49 seconds before suffering a hyperextended knee. Upon recovering, he was reassigned to the Crunch for a short moment before being recalled to the NHL level on December 6, 2011. While Saku Koivu recovered from an injury, Ducks head coach Bruce Boudreau gave Bonino a chance on the second line between Bobby Ryan and Teemu Selanne. In this new role, he earned longer ice time and ended his 30-game pointless streak with his second career goal in a game against the Dallas Stars. Bonino was eventually moved down to the Duck's third line between Jason Blake and Andrew Cogliano on January 6, which also began the teams' seven-game point streak. He immediately made an impact between Blake and Cogliano as they combined for four goals and 11 points through a three-game period. He suffered a lower-body injury during a loss to the St. Louis Blues, which kept him out of two games. Once he recovered, Bonino experienced his best game of the season on March 19 against the Sharks. During the game, he played on a line with Ryan and Palmieri and tied his career-best plus-three rating while also tallying a career-high three assists en route to a 5–3 win. His hot streak continued as the season concluded as he posted six points in his last nine games. Bonino finished the season with five goals and 18 points through 50 games with limited penalty minutes. He also blocked 39 shots and ranked third on the team in faceoff wins and faceoff attempts.

As a restricted free agent at the conclusion of the 2011–12 season, Bonino was extended a qualifying offer by the Ducks. Bonino originally filed for arbitration before agreeing to sign a two-year, $1.4 million deal to avoid arbitration. When the 2012–13 NHL lockout began in September, Bonino remained in California to train with some Ducks teammates and other NHLers. He eventually signed a lockout contract with HC Neumarkt-Egna in the Italian Serie A2 league, which included an opt-out clause if the NHL resumed play. During his time in with the Italian Serie A2 league, Bonino accumulated 26 goals and 26 assists for 52 points through 19 games. In January, Bonino returned to North America and was named to the Ducks' opening night roster when the lockout ended. Although Anaheim began the season with a 5–1–1 start, Bonino went scoreless in his first six games before scoring his first NHL hat-trick in a 7–4 win over the Los Angeles Kings on February 2, 2013. He scored two more goals in February before missing 20 games to recover from a lower body injury incurred on March 10. Bonino returned to the Ducks lineup on April 21 and he was slotted into the second line centre role between Palmieri and Selanne. While playing the final four games of the regular season, Bonino combined for three points on the power play. He finished the regular season with 13 points, including five goals, which tied a career high. This continued into the 2013 Stanley Cup playoffs where he opened the scoring in Game 1 against the Detroit Red Wings for an eventual 3–1 win. Bonino became one of Anaheim's most reliable centers during the opening round, routinely taking faceoffs at both ends of the ice and winning half of them. He also scored the game-winning goal in Game 5, although the Ducks would lose the seven game match.

Bonino returned to the Ducks for the 2013–14 season, his last with the team. This would prove to be a breakout season for him, hitting career highs in goals, assists, and points. Bonino played in the Duck's home opener against the New York Rangers but suffered a lower body injury after taking a slap shot off the leg. After returning from the injury, Bonino emerged as a consistent scoring threat for the Ducks while playing on their fourth line. By December, he was one of five skaters to play in every game while averaging 16:07 of ice time. He was also used on both the first power-play unit and on the penalty kill. At this time, he had also recorded 10 goals and 25 points while on pace for 21 goals and 37 assists. Bonino also helped the team in faceoffs by winning 50.4% of his draws and led all Ducks' forwards with 28 blocked shots. Before suffering a right wrist injury after colliding with Philadelphia Flyers forward Zac Rinaldo in late January, Bonino ranked third on the team with 16 goals and 24 assists for 40 points. He returned to the Ducks lineup for a short while, accumulating one goal and three more assists, before being sidelined with a foot injury in mid-March. Bonino finished the regular season with 22 goals and 27 assists for 49 points and a +14 rating as he helped the Ducks maintain a record of 54–20–8, the best mark in franchise history. As the Ducks qualified for the 2014 Stanley Cup playoffs, Bonino's success during the regular season continued into their postseason contests against the Dallas Stars and Los Angeles Kings. During the first round of the Western Conference playoff series, Bonino lifted the Ducks to a 5–4 overtime win over the Stars in Game 6 to send them to round two.

==== Vancouver Canucks ====
On June 27, 2014, after a breakout season in 2013–14, Bonino was traded to the Vancouver Canucks with defenseman Luca Sbisa and a first- and third-round pick in 2014 in exchange for Ryan Kesler and a third-round pick in 2015. While playing with the Canucks during the pre-season, Bonino tallied two goals and two assists for four points through five games. He continued to show off his offensive abilities during the regular season and quickly became one of the Canucks top point scorer. By the seventh game of the season, Bonino had tallied two goals and two assists for four points. While maintaining his scoring prowess, Bonino centred the Canucks second line between Alex Burrows and Chris Higgins. By the end of October, Bonino had accumulated four goals and five assists through the first 12 games of the season. He continued to build momentum throughout November and December and was consistently ranked among the Canucks top scorers. Bonino finished the first quarter of the season with eight goals and 13 assists for 21 points through 34 games.

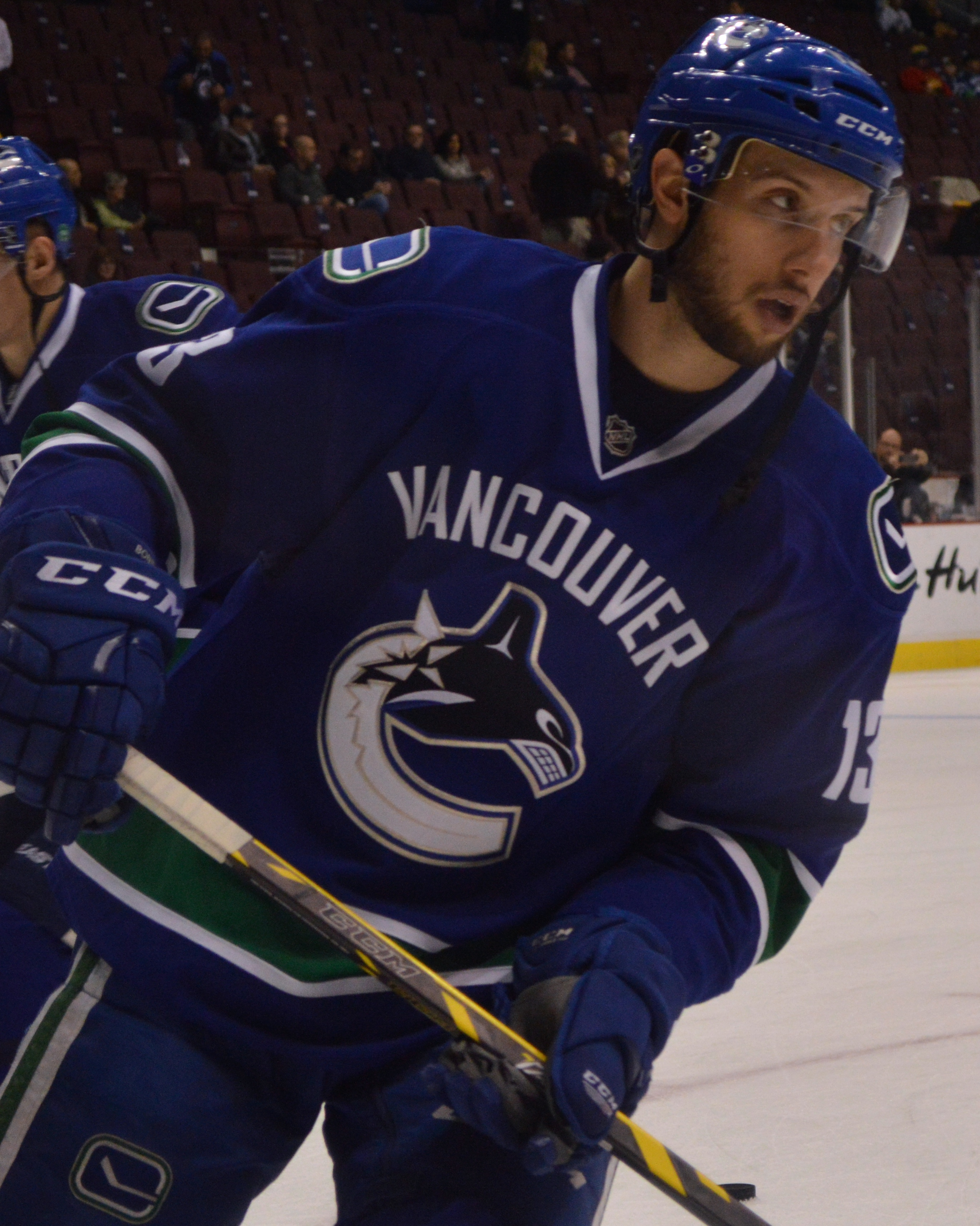
Bonino with the Canucks in February 2015

Bonino's momentum was cut short after he suffered a lower body injury blocking a shot from Ryan Suter on February 9, 2015. He subsequently missed seven games to recover before returning for the Canucks' contest against the Boston Bruins. However, shortly after returning from injury, Bonino missed more time due to an undisclosed injury. Near the end of March, Radim Vrbata joined Bonino and Higgins on the Canucks second line. During their first six games as a line, Bonino tallied five points while Higgins tallied four. Their success continued throughout the month as the Canucks manufacture over three goals rated per 60 minutes of even-strength ice time when Vrbata plays with Bonino at full strength. Bonino finished the regular season with 15 goals and 24 assists for 39 points through 75 games. Of those 15 goals, six were game-winners.

As the Canucks qualified for the 2015 Stanley Cup playoffs, Bonino and the team faced off against the Calgary Flames in the first round. His only goal of the series came during Game 5 as the Canucks were facing elimination. Although the Canucks fell to the Flames in six games, Bonino tallied one goal and two assists for three points through six games.

==== Pittsburgh Penguins ====
On July 28, 2015, for the second time in as many years, Bonino was traded to the Pittsburgh Penguins along with Adam Clendening and a 2nd round pick in 2016 for Brandon Sutter and a third-round pick. Upon gaining Bonino, Penguins general manager Jim Rutherford praised him for being a smart player who could play in all situations. He was expected to be part of the Penguin's second power play unit and on their penalty kill. The Penguins began the season with a 3–4–0 record and a dismal 1.57 average goals scored per game for second-worst in the league. Bonino scored his first goal with the team in his seventh game, during which he also received an elbow to the face from Stars defenseman Jason Demers. Demers was later suspended two games for the hit. Following their loss to the Stars, Bonino gained two new linemates on the third line; Chris Kunitz and Daniel Sprong. This later switched to Patric Hornqvist and Beau Bennett in November while Kunitz returned to the wing of captain Sidney Crosby. As the Penguins third-line center, he was also a key forward on the Penguins' penalty kill and ranked third among the team forwards in shorthanded ice time per game at 2:26. After he accumulated 10 points in 40 games, Bonino suffered a hand injury in a loss to the Carolina Hurricanes and was expected to miss a month to recover. He returned to the lineup after missing 17 games on February 26, 2016, against the Winnipeg Jets.

After Evgeni Malkin suffered a long-term upper-body injury on March 11 against the Columbus Blue Jackets, head coach Mike Sullivan put together a line of Carl Hagelin, Bonino, and Phil Kessel. They were aptly named the HBK line in reference to their last initials and Shawn Michaels (Heartbreak Kid) of the WWE. After they went pointless in their first two games together, the line began to develop chemistry and generated more offensive opportunities. Their first points came on March 17 after Bonino and Kessel each scored against the Carolina Hurricanes while Hagelin notched three assists. Their scoring prowess continued as the Penguins made a push for the 2016 Stanley Cup playoffs. On March 26, Kessel and Bonino each recorded a career-high five points in the Penguins' 7–2 win over the Detroit Red Wings to help them maintain their third position in the Metropolitan Division. Over the last 15 games of the regular season, the HBK line combined for 17 goals and 43 points.

Once the Penguins qualified for the 2016 Stanley Cup playoffs, the HBK line helped them eliminate the New York Rangers, Washington Capitals, Tampa Bay Lightning, and San Jose Sharks. They totalled four goals and 12 points during the first round of the playoffs and then combined for seven goals and 18 points in six games against the Alex Ovechkin-led Capitals. In their final game against the Capitals, the HBK line combined on all four goals to lead them to the Eastern Conference Final against the Lightning. After three contests against the Lightning, Crosby praised the HBK line for giving the team momentum throughout the playoffs. At the time, they had combined for three goals and six assists during the series for a total of 39 points during the Stanley Cup Playoffs. Bonino tallied two points in the 5–2 win in Game 6 against the Lightning before suffering an injury in Game 7 after blocking a shot from forward Jonathan Drouin. Once the Penguins eliminated the Lightning, the HBK line had for 17 goals through 18 games and Bonino had accumulated 15 points. While playing in his first Stanely Cup Finals, Bonino scored the game-winning goal late in Game 1 to lead the Penguins over the San Jose Sharks. The following game, the HBK line consistently faced off against Logan Couture's line. They were on the ice together for 7:16 of even-strength ice time as Bonino had three takeaways and four blocked shots to Couture's three hits. While the Penguins won Games 1 and 2, they lost in overtime of Game 3 after the Sharks tied the game following a four-minute penalty to Bonino. Although the Sharks pushed the Penguins to Game 6, they were defeated 3–1 en route to the Penguins fourth Stanley Cup championship. During his Day With The Cup, Bonino visited the Connecticut Children's Medical Center and donated $10,000.

Due to the absence of Crosby and Malkin, who were competing in the 2016 World Cup of Hockey, Bonino entered the Penguins' training camp as their No. 1 center on the roster. In this role, he began to take on more leadership responsibilities including mentoring rookies and younger players. Although he suffered an injury after blocking a shot during an intrasquad scrimmage, Bonino was named to the Penguins opening night roster for the 2016–17 season. The HBK line was originally reunited to start the season but a scoring slump resulted in them being split up. After they failed to produce an even-strength goal in the Penguins' first five games, Kessel was moved to Malkin's wing while Bryan Rust slid into Kessel's old spot. Due to repeated inconsistency and injuries, the HBK line was reunited on November 25, 2016, for a win over the New Jersey Devils. However, they were still not a consistent line for the Penguins throughout the season as they struggled to produce points or create opportunities when playing together. Although his offensive numbers went down compared to the previous season, Bonino led all NHL forwards with 81 blocked shots by mid-February. On March 8, 2017, Bonino tallied his second career hat-trick in a 7–4 win over the Winnipeg Jets to give him 12 goals on the season.

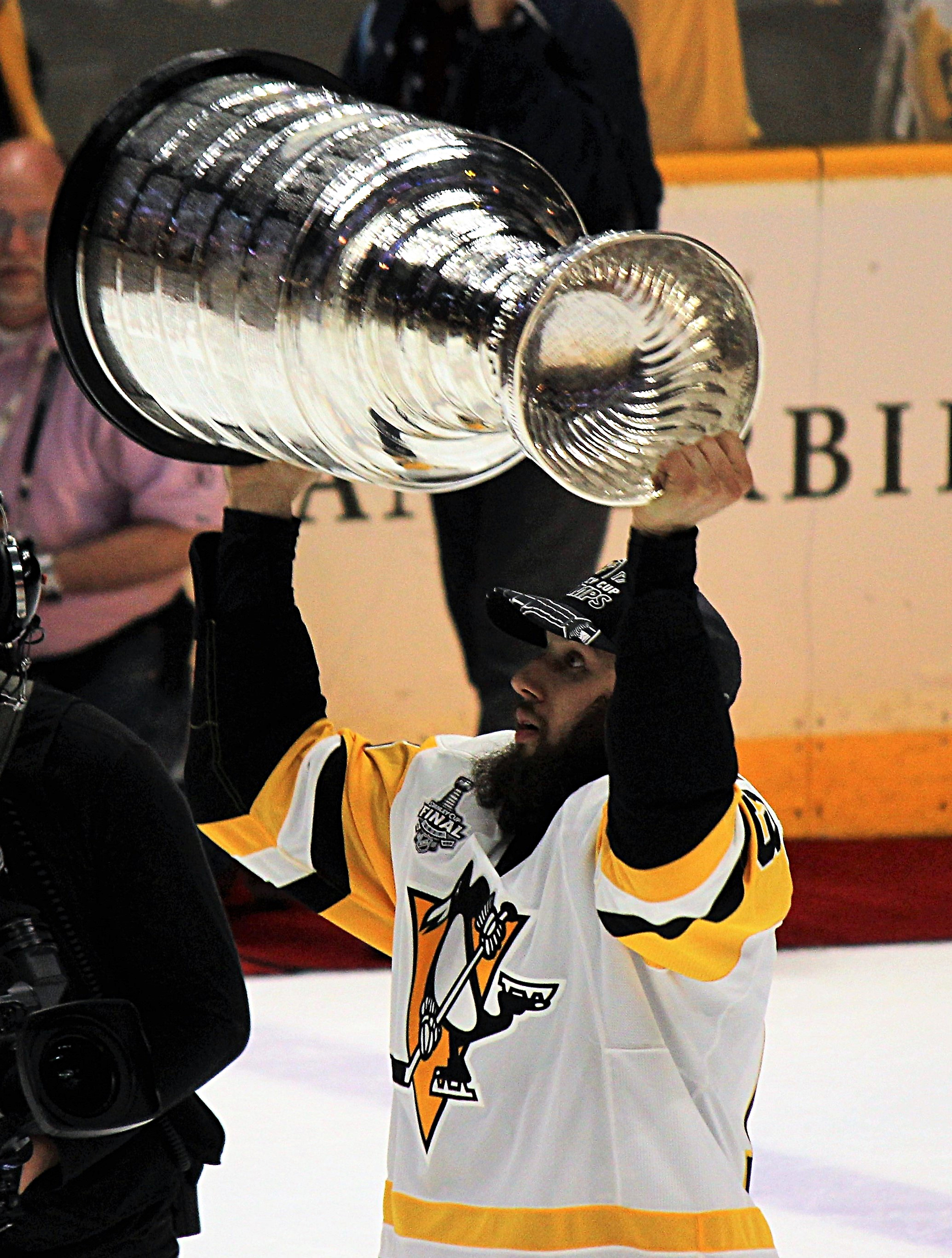
Bonino raising the Stanley Cup, Pittsburgh 2017

Bonino and the Penguins qualified for the 2017 Stanley Cup playoffs after they defeated the Buffalo Sabres 3–1 on March 21, 2017. As they faced off against the Columbus Blue Jackets in the Eastern Conference First Round, Bonino was expected to center their third line between Scott Wilson and Patric Hornqvist. In game three, Bonino took a deflected puck in the head five minutes into the game but he returned for their eventual 5–4 overtime win. After Conor Sheary went pointless throughout the series, he was moved to Bonino's wing with Wilson for game six while Hornqvist replaced him on the right wing of Crosby's line. The Penguins eventually eliminated the Blue Jackets in game five and faced off against the Capitals in the second round. During the Penguin's Eastern Conference semifinals series against the Capitals, Bonino played with numerous wingers as Sullivan moved around the forward lines but failed to produce at the same pace as the previous season. He started the series playing with Sheary and Wilson on the third line as Hagelin recovered from injury and Kessel played on a line with Malkin and Rust. Bonino began the series strong, breaking a third-period to lead the Penguins to a 3–2 win in game one. The HBK line was shortly reunited in game two as Sullivan double shifted Kessel early in the game but was split up again the following game. After reuniting the HBK line for two periods during game six, Sullivan moved Kessel to right wing next to Malkin while Hagelin was moved to left wing on the fourth line.

The Penguins eventually eliminated the Capitals in game seven and faced off against the Ottawa Senators in the Eastern Conference Finals. After Rust returned to the lineup for game five, he developed instant chemistry with Bonino and Carter Rowney on the third line. In the Penguins' 7–0 win, the line combined for one goal and six assists to help the team take a 3–2 series lead. The line remained together through the next two games as the Penguins qualified for the 2017 Stanley Cup Final against the Nashville Predators. He played in the first two games of the series before suffering a foot injury after blocking a shot from P.K. Subban with his ankle. After being helped off the ice, Bonino returned to the bench before the end of the period. At the time of the injury, he had tallied seven points through 21 games while also spending time on the penalty kill. He subsequently missed the remaining games as the Penguins won their second Stanley Cup in as many years. He later reported that he had finished game two with a broken leg as his tibia had cracked all the way through.

==== Nashville Predators ====
After winning the Stanley Cup in each of his two seasons in Pittsburgh, Bonino left as a free agent to sign a four-year $16.4 million contract with the Nashville Predators on July 1, 2017. Upon joining the Predators, Bonino stated that the team was his number one choice because "it was a team that I know has a chance to win immediately, and it's somewhere I definitely wanted to be." During the offs-eason, Bonino underwent surgery resulting in him missing all of Nashville's preseason contests from September 19 to 30. Prior to returning from injury, Bonino was named to the team's leadership team alongside P.K. Subban and Pekka Rinne. When the Predators announced their opening night roster, Bonino and defenseman Ryan Ellis were designated non-roster players but stayed with the team at the NHL level. He eventually made his season debut on October 5, playing on the Predators second line between Scott Hartnell and Kevin Fiala. Bonino scored one goal in five games before suffering a lower-body injury on October 14. He was subsequently placed on injured reserve and missed over three weeks to recover. Upon returning from injury, Bonino settled into a bottom-six role, moving around the lineup as necessary. While playing alongside Kevin Fiala and Calle Jarnkrok, the line helped the Predators win their fifth straight game by coming for eight points in a 4–3 win over the Florida Panthers on January 19, 2018. This marked the first time that the Predators posted multiple five-game win streaks since the 2014–15 season. He later scored an empty-net goal to help the Predators secure their franchise-record ninth straight win on March 6. He repeated this later in the month as the Predators set a franchise point record with 111 points.

Bonino and the Predators clinched a playoff berth by entering the postseason as the Central Division champions and Presidents' Trophy winners. As such, they met with the Colorado Avalanche in the first round of the 2018 Stanley Cup playoffs. Bonino tallied one goal and two assists to help the Predators shutout the Avalanche in Game 6 in order to qualify for the second round. While playing alongside Colton Sissons and Austin Watson in round one, the line combined for nine goals and 19 points. After the Predators were eliminated from Stanley Cup contention by the Winnipeg Jets, Bonino joined Team USA at the 2018 IIHF World Championship.

After scoring the game-winning goal to secure Team USA a bronze medal, Bonino returned to the Predators for the 2018–19 season. He was projected to start the season centering the Predator's third line between Eeli Tolvanen and Craig Smith. Bonino was eventually reunited with Sissons and Ryan Hartman early in the season for a defensive-focused forward line by coach Peter Laviolette. As a member of this line, he tallied three assists to help Sissons complete his second regular-season NHL hat trick during a game against the Avalanche. Although Bonino was producing points, he experienced a 17-game scoring drought before scoring his first goal of the season on November 15, 2018, in a loss to the Arizona Coyotes. He later played in his 500th career NHL game on November 21, 2018, in a win over the St. Louis Blues. Laviolette later put Bonino on a line with Rocco Grimaldi and Wayne Simmonds as he felt "[Grimaldi] brings tenacity to the line, [Bonino] is a pretty good playmaker and [Simmonds] brings pucks to the net." Bonino and the Predators once again became the Central Division champions as they met with the Dallas Stars in the first round of the 2019 Stanley Cup playoffs.

After being eliminated from the playoffs by the Stars, the Predators signed Matt Duchene as a free-agent and traded Subban to the New Jersey Devils in exchange for Steven Santini. They also lost Simmonds to the Devils and center Brian Boyle. Despite these loses, Bonino began the 2019–20 season strong by scoring eight goals four assists in his first 15 games to tie with Nathan MacKinnon, Mark Stone, and T. J. Oshie. His eight goals with 31 recorded shots on goal through the first 15 games while also maintaining a 25.8 shooting percentage. During this period, Bonino also recorded his third NHL hat-trick in a 3–0 win against the Chicago Blackhawks on October 29. He continued to produce as the season continued, leading the team in goals with 10 by December for a total of 16 points in 27 games. While the NHL was suspended due to the COVID-19 pandemic, Bonino encouraged people to stay home and self-isolate. He specifically admonished those ignoring the CDC suggestions and encouraged the shutdown of Broadway.

==== Minnesota Wild ====
Approaching his final season under contract, on October 7, 2020, Bonino was traded by the Predators to division rival the Minnesota Wild, along with second- and third-round picks in 2020, in exchange for Luke Kunin and a fourth-round pick in 2020. Upon joining the Wild, Bonino and Marcus Johansson joined Kevin Fiala on a line during training camp as coach Dean Evason felt they could develop chemistry together. His first goal with the team came on January 20, 2021, and it was his first power-play goal since October 15, 2019. After Bonino and numerous teammates were placed on the NHL's COVID-19 protocol list, the Wild postponed six games in late February. Bonino was removed from COVID protocol on February 15 and added to the Wild's active roster. Upon rejoining the team, Bonino was paired with Nico Sturm and Nick Bjugstad, but Bjugstad was later replaced by Zach Parise. He experienced a scoreless drought shortly after re-joining the team but snapped it at six games on March 30.

Bonino and the Wild qualified for the 2021 Stanley Cup playoffs where they faced off against the Vegas Golden Knights in round one. The Knights eliminated the Wild from playoff contention after beating them 6–2 in Game 7. Bonino played in all seven games of the series but failed to produce a point.

==== San Jose Sharks ====
On July 28, 2021, Bonino as an original San Jose Sharks draft pick, re-joined the team by signing a two-year, $4.1 million contract as a free agent. Upon joining the Sharks, Bonino became their third-line center in between Kevin Labanc and Matt Nieto. The team began the season with a 7–5–1 record after they lost several veteran players to COVID-19 protocol. As Bonino failed to develop chemistry with Labanc, Bonino skated with Nieto and Andrew Cogliano for the majority of the season. He scored his first goal as a Shark on November 24, 2021, becoming the fifth Sharks player to score in his 700th NHL game. Near the end of the season, Bonino skated on Logan Couture's wing where he scored eight of his 16 goals in his last 15 games. He finished the season with 16 goals and 26 points.

During the 2022–23 off-season, the Sharks hired David Quinn as their new head coach. Quinn had previously coached Bonino during his time in Boston. Prior to the start of the 2022–23 NHL season, Quinn announced that Bonino had been named as an alternate captain of the team. After missing the teams' first three games due to an upper-body injury, Bonino set a new career high by scoring one goal in four consecutive games.

==== Return to Pittsburgh ====
On March 3, 2023, Bonino was traded back to the Penguins by the Sharks in a three-team trade. In exchange for Bonino, the Sharks received prospect Arvid Henriksson and two draft picks while the Montreal Canadiens acquired Sharks defenseman Tony Sund and their 2024 fifth-round draft pick. After playing three games with the Penguins, and recording no points, Bonino suffered a lacerated kidney on March 11 during a game against the New York Islanders. Although he finished playing the game, Bonino was later hospitalized and underwent an unspecified procedure to correct the kidney. Following the surgery, Bonino was placed on long term injured reserve and the Penguins called up Mark Friedman on an emergency basis. Bonino was activated off injured reserve on April 25 after the Penguins season had ended.

==== New York Rangers ====
On July 1, 2023, Bonino left the Penguins and was signed as a free agent to a one-year, $800,000 deal with the New York Rangers for the 2023–24 season. He was put on waivers by the Rangers on January 25, 2024, after posting one goal and four assists in 45 games, and after clearing he was assigned to New York's AHL affiliate, the Hartford Wolf Pack. Opting not to report to the AHL over the NHL All-Star break, Bonino was placed on unconditional waivers and subsequently mutually terminated his contract with the Rangers on February 7.

==== Europe and retirement ====
On November 22, 2024, Bonino signed a contract to play the remainder of the 2024-25 season with HK Olimpija, a team based in Ljubljana, Slovenia that plays in the multi-state International Central European Hockey League (ICEHL).

== Coaching career ==
Bonino announced his retirement from ice hockey on June 18, 2025, in order to join Dan Muse's new coaching staff with the Penguins. He joined Dan Muse's new coaching staff with the Penguins on June 20.

== International play ==
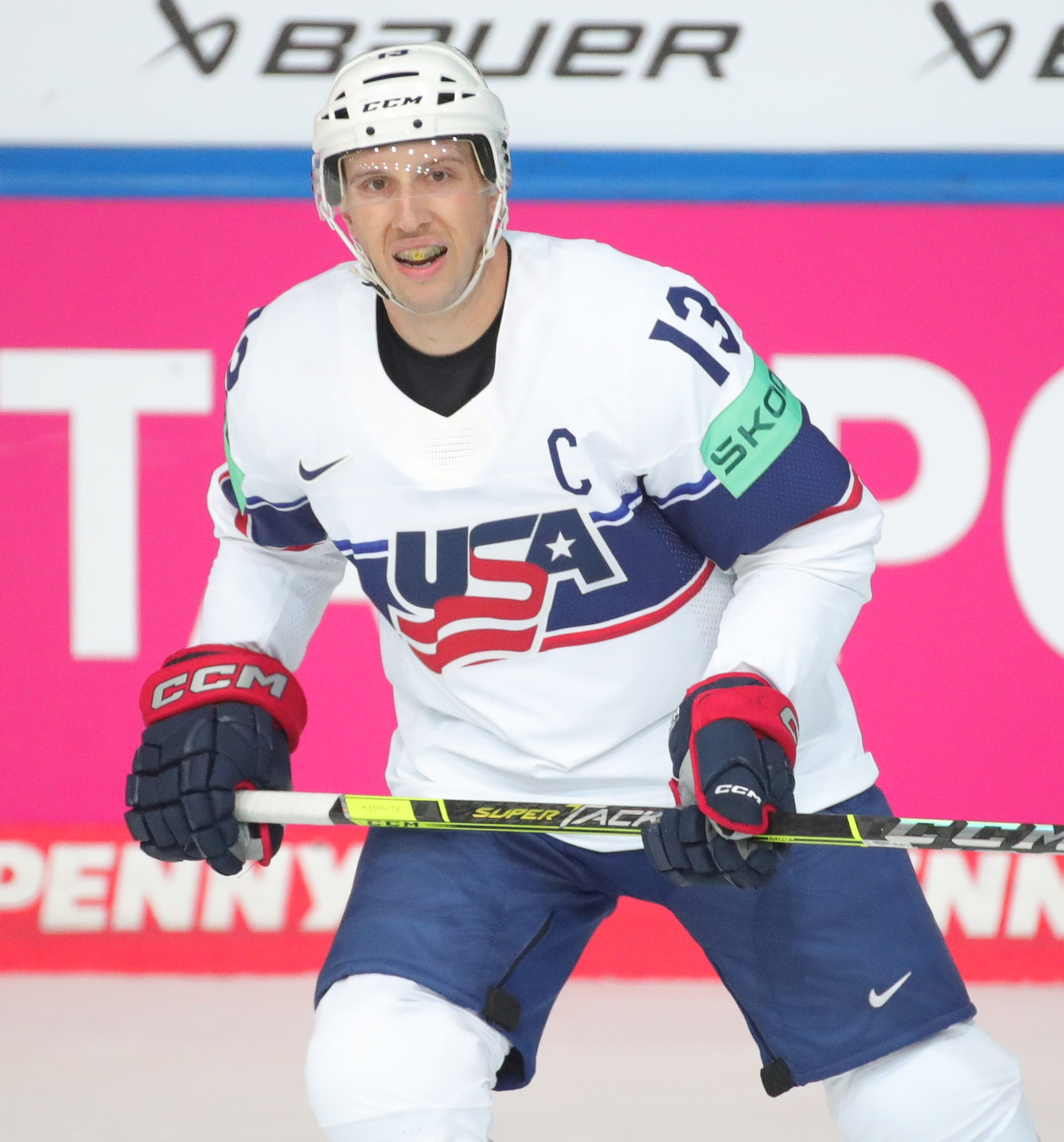
- Bonino with Team USA in 2023

Medal record

Representing United States

Ice hockey

World Championships
Bronze medal – third place	2015 Czech Republic	
Bronze medal – third place	2018 Denmark	

As an American citizen, Bonino has represented his home country three times at the senior level on the international stage. He made his Team USA debut during the 2015 IIHF World Championship. Bonino scored his first goal for Team USA during their 5–1 routing of Team Finland in the tournaments opening game. His second goal of the tournament came during Team USA's last game of the tournament. During the bronze medal game against the Czech Republic, Bonino scored a goal and an assist to help Team USA clinch a medal. He subsequently finished the tournament with two goals and two assists for four points.

Upon finishing his first full season with the Nashville Predators, Bonino was again added to Team USA's roster for the 2018 IIHF World Championship. In his second international tournament, Bonino scored the game-winning goal to earn Team USA a bronze medal against Canada. At the age of 35, Bonino was again added to Team USA's roster ahead of the 2023 IIHF World Championship. As the oldest player on the roster, he was appointed captain along with alternates Conor Garland and Alex Tuch. Despite missing one game, Bonino tallied three goals and an assist to help Team USA win seven consecutive games in the preliminary round. However, unlike the previous two championships, Bonino and Team USA failed to qualify for the medal round and placed fourth.

== Personal life ==
In 2014, Bonino married Lauren Cherewyk, a former forward for the Boston University women's hockey team. The couple have three children; two daughters and a son.

== Career statistics ==
=== Regular season and playoffs ===
			Regular season					Playoffs
Season	Team	League	GP	G	A	Pts	PIM	GP	G	A	Pts	PIM
2003–04	Farmington High School	HS-CT	24	44	23	67	10	—	—	—	—	—
2004–05	Farmington High School	HS-CT	24	68	23	91	12	—	—	—	—	—
2005–06	Avon Old Farms	HS-Prep	26	26	30	56	10	—	—	—	—	—
2006–07	Avon Old Farms	HS-Prep	26	24	42	66	14	—	—	—	—	—
2007–08	Boston University	HE	39	16	13	29	10	—	—	—	—	—
2008–09	Boston University	HE	44	18	32	50	30	—	—	—	—	—
2009–10	Boston University	HE	33	11	27	38	12	—	—	—	—	—
2009–10	Anaheim Ducks	NHL	9	1	1	2	6	—	—	—	—	—
2010–11	Syracuse Crunch	AHL	50	12	33	45	32	—	—	—	—	—
2010–11	Anaheim Ducks	NHL	26	0	0	0	4	4	0	0	0	2
2011–12	Syracuse Crunch	AHL	19	6	16	22	2	—	—	—	—	—
2011–12	Anaheim Ducks	NHL	50	5	13	18	8	—	—	—	—	—
2012–13	HC Neumarkt-Egna	ITA.2	19	26	26	52	14	—	—	—	—	—
2012–13	Anaheim Ducks	NHL	27	5	8	13	8	7	3	1	4	4
2013–14	Anaheim Ducks	NHL	77	22	27	49	22	13	4	4	8	8
2014–15	Vancouver Canucks	NHL	75	15	24	39	22	6	1	2	3	4
2015–16	Pittsburgh Penguins	NHL	63	9	20	29	31	24	4	14	18	12
2016–17	Pittsburgh Penguins	NHL	80	18	19	37	16	21	4	3	7	2
2017–18	Nashville Predators	NHL	71	12	13	25	20	13	2	3	5	9
2018–19	Nashville Predators	NHL	81	17	18	35	18	6	0	2	2	2
2019–20	Nashville Predators	NHL	67	18	17	35	16	4	1	0	1	2
2020–21	Minnesota Wild	NHL	55	10	16	26	26	7	0	0	0	0
2021–22	San Jose Sharks	NHL	80	16	10	26	18	—	—	—	—	—
2022–23	San Jose Sharks	NHL	59	10	9	19	28	—	—	—	—	—
2022–23	Pittsburgh Penguins	NHL	3	0	0	0	0	—	—	—	—	—
2023–24	New York Rangers	NHL	45	1	4	5	8	—	—	—	—	—
2024–25	HK Olimpija	ICEHL	22	6	11	17	10	2	0	1	1	0
NHL totals			868	159	199	358	251	105	19	29	48	45

=== International ===
Year	Team	Event	Result	GP	G	A	Pts	PIM
2015	United States	WC	3rd place, bronze medalist(s)	10	2	2	4	10
2018	United States	WC	3rd place, bronze medalist(s)	5	1	3	4	0
2023	United States	WC	4th	9	3	1	4	2
Senior totals				24	6	6	12	12

== Awards and honors ==
Awards	Year	Ref
College
NCAA All-Tournament Team	2009	
NHL
Stanley Cup champion	2016, 2017	
