= HC Falcons Brixen =

- City: Brixen, Italy
- League: Italian Hockey League
- Founded: 2013
- Home arena: Palaghiaccio di Bressanone
- Colors: Blue, red, white

Franchise history
- 2013–present: HC Falcons Brixen

Championships
- Regular season titles: 2018
- Division 1: 2018

The HC Falcons Brixen are an Italian professional ice hockey team in Brixen, that plays in Italian Hockey League.

== History ==
After Brixen's original professional team folded in 2008, ice hockey return to the city when HC Falcons Brixen was founded in 2013. Playing the predominantly German-speaking region of South Tyrol, the club began play in the lower Austrian leagues, getting as far as the semifinal round of fourth Austrian league. In 2017, the club transferred into the Italian hierarchy and joined Division I. Brixen had immediate success, winning the league championship and earning a promotion to the Italian Hockey League (2nd league) for 2018.

Initially the club had success in the IHL, however, Brixen was hit hard by the COVID-19 pandemic. In the five years following the pandemic, the Falcons did not produce a single winning season and missed the postseason three times in that span.

== Season-by-season results ==
Since 2017

Season	GP	W	OTW	OTL	L	Pts	GF	GA	Finish	Playoffs
Division 1
2017–18	20	15	1	1	4	47	131	51	1st of 6, Gruppo Est; 1st of 11, Division 1	Won Championship
Italian Hockey League
2018–19	18	9	1	1	7	30	55	52	t-4th of 10, IHL	Finished 5th in Winners Round-robin, 1-1-1-5; Won Quarterfinal series, 3–0 (A.S.D. Hockey Pergine); Lost Semifinal series, 1–3 (HC Merano)
2019–20	20	7	1	3	9	26	44	60	6th of 11, IHL	Finished 4th in Winners Round-robin, 4-1-1-4; Quarterfinal series, 1–2 (ValpEagle); Postseason cancelled
2020–21	16	5	2	1	8	20	48	54	6th of 10, IHL	Lost Quarterfinal series, 2–3 (SV Kaltern)
2021–22	18	3	2	0	13	13	37	73	9th of 10, IHL	Finished 5th in Losers Round-robin, 0-1-1-6; Did not qualify
2022–23	18	7	0	0	11	21	46	73	8th of 10, IHL	Finished 3rd in Losers Round-robin, 5-0-0-3; Lost Quarterfinal series, 0–3 (HC Varese)
2023–24	20	4	0	2	14	14	40	84	9th of 11, IHL	Finished 5th in Losers Round-robin, 2-2-2-4; Did not qualify
2024–25	24	4	0	2	18	14	69	135	12th of 13, IHL	Finished 7th in Losers Round-robin, 1-0-0-11; Did not qualify
