= Tony Tuzzolino =

- Born: October 9, 1975 (age 50) Buffalo, New York, U.S.
- Height: 6 ft 2 in (188 cm)
- Weight: 202 lb (92 kg; 14 st 6 lb)
- Position: Center
- Shot: Right
- Played for: Mighty Ducks of Anaheim; New York Rangers; Boston Bruins; Modo Hockey
- National team: Italy
- NHL draft: 113th overall, 1994; Quebec Nordiques
- Playing career: 1997–2010

Anthony Charles Tuzzolino (born October 9, 1975) is an Italian-American former professional ice hockey center. Tuzzolino was drafted 113th overall by the Quebec Nordiques in the 1994 NHL Entry Draft. After completing his collegiate career with Michigan State University of the CCHA he went on to play professionally in both the major and minor professional hockey league teams. He played for the Mighty Ducks of Anaheim, the New York Rangers and for the Boston Bruins of the NHL and Cincinnati, Lexington, Hartford, Providence, and Houston in the AHL. His younger brother Nicolas Tuzzolino was also a professional hockey player who played in the AHL and ECHL.

== Playing career ==
Tuzzolino was drafted 113th overall by the Quebec Nordiques in the 1994 NHL entry draft. After completing his collegiate career with Michigan State University of the CCHA he went on to play in the National Hockey League. He played for the Mighty Ducks of Anaheim, the New York Rangers and for the Boston Bruins.

In 2003, he moved to Italy to play in their Serie A league, where he had spells with Asiago, Bolzano and Cortina in a three-year spell in the league. He also had a spell in Sweden's Elitserien with Modo Hockey. He briefly returned to America with the United Hockey League but soon returned to Italy, joining Renon Ritten. He signed on for another year with the club for 2007–08. After completing his second year with Ritten, Tuzzolino returned to Asiago signing a one-year contract on September 22, 2008.

In the 2009–10 season, Tuzzolino returned to Italy signing with Eppan-Appiano of the Italian Serie B on January 10, 2010.

== International play ==
A dual American-Italian citizen Tuzzolino represented Italy in the 2006 Winter Olympics. After four games with the Italians Tony finished the tournament as the leader with 32 penalty minutes.

== Career statistics ==
=== Regular season and playoffs ===
			Regular season					Playoffs
Season	Team	League	GP	G	A	Pts	PIM	GP	G	A	Pts	PIM
1991–92	Niagara Scenics	NAHL	45	19	27	46	82	—	—	—	—	—
1992–93	Niagara Scenics	NAHL	50	36	41	77	134	—	—	—	—	—
1993–94	Michigan State University	CCHA	38	4	3	7	50	—	—	—	—	—
1994–95	Michigan State University	CCHA	39	9	19	28	81	—	—	—	—	—
1995–96	Michigan State University	CCHA	41	12	17	29	120	—	—	—	—	—
1996–97	Michigan State University	CCHA	39	14	18	32	120	—	—	—	—	—
1997–98	Kentucky Thoroughblades	AHL	35	9	14	23	83	—	—	—	—	—
1997–98	Cincinnati Mighty Ducks	AHL	13	3	3	6	6	—	—	—	—	—
1997–98	Mighty Ducks of Anaheim	NHL	1	0	0	0	2	—	—	—	—	—
1998–99	Cincinnati Mighty Ducks	AHL	50	4	10	14	55	—	—	—	—	—
1998–99	Cleveland Lumberjacks	IHL	15	2	4	6	22	—	—	—	—	—
1999–00	Huntington Blizzard	ECHL	20	6	13	19	43	—	—	—	—	—
1999–00	Cincinnati Mighty Ducks	AHL	15	0	3	3	8	—	—	—	—	—
1999–00	Hartford Wolf Pack	AHL	32	3	8	11	41	19	2	2	4	16
2000–01	Hartford Wolf Pack	AHL	47	12	23	35	136	5	0	2	2	6
2000–01	New York Rangers	NHL	6	0	0	0	5	—	—	—	—	—
2001–02	Providence Bruins	AHL	59	10	19	29	123	1	0	0	0	0
2001–02	Boston Bruins	NHL	2	0	0	0	0	—	—	—	—	—
2002–03	Houston Aeros	AHL	50	9	6	15	92	23	4	4	8	43
2002–03	Louisiana IceGators	ECHL	12	8	7	15	47	—	—	—	—	—
2003–04	Binghamton Senators	AHL	13	1	3	4	12	—	—	—	—	—
2003–04	HC Asiago	ITA	16	6	9	15	67	12	7	3	10	30
2004–05	HC Bolzano	ITA	32	13	19	32	78	9	3	3	6	24
2005–06	SG Cortina	ITA	26	12	12	24	87	—	—	—	—	—
2005–06	Modo Hockey	SEL	11	2	1	3	14	5	0	0	0	12
2006–07	Flint Generals	UHL	14	4	15	19	28	—	—	—	—	—
2006–07	Ritten Sport	ITA	15	7	9	16	14	8	2	5	7	24
2007–08	Ritten Sport	ITA	20	5	18	23	34	13	3	6	9	24
2008–09	HC Asiago	ITA	37	12	30	42	60	—	—	—	—	—
2009–10	Flint Generals	IHL	37	5	12	17	69	—	—	—	—	—
2009–10	HC Eppan Pirates	ITA-2	6	2	4	6	6	13	5	10	15	36
AHL totals			314	51	89	140	556	48	6	8	14	65
NHL totals			9	0	0	0	7	—	—	—	—	—
ITA totals			142	50	94	144	318	45	17	19	36	110

=== International ===
Year	Team	Event	GP	G	A	Pts	PIM
2006	Italy	OG	4	0	1	1	32
Senior totals			4	0	1	1	32
