= Derek Eastman (ice hockey) =

American professional ice hockey player

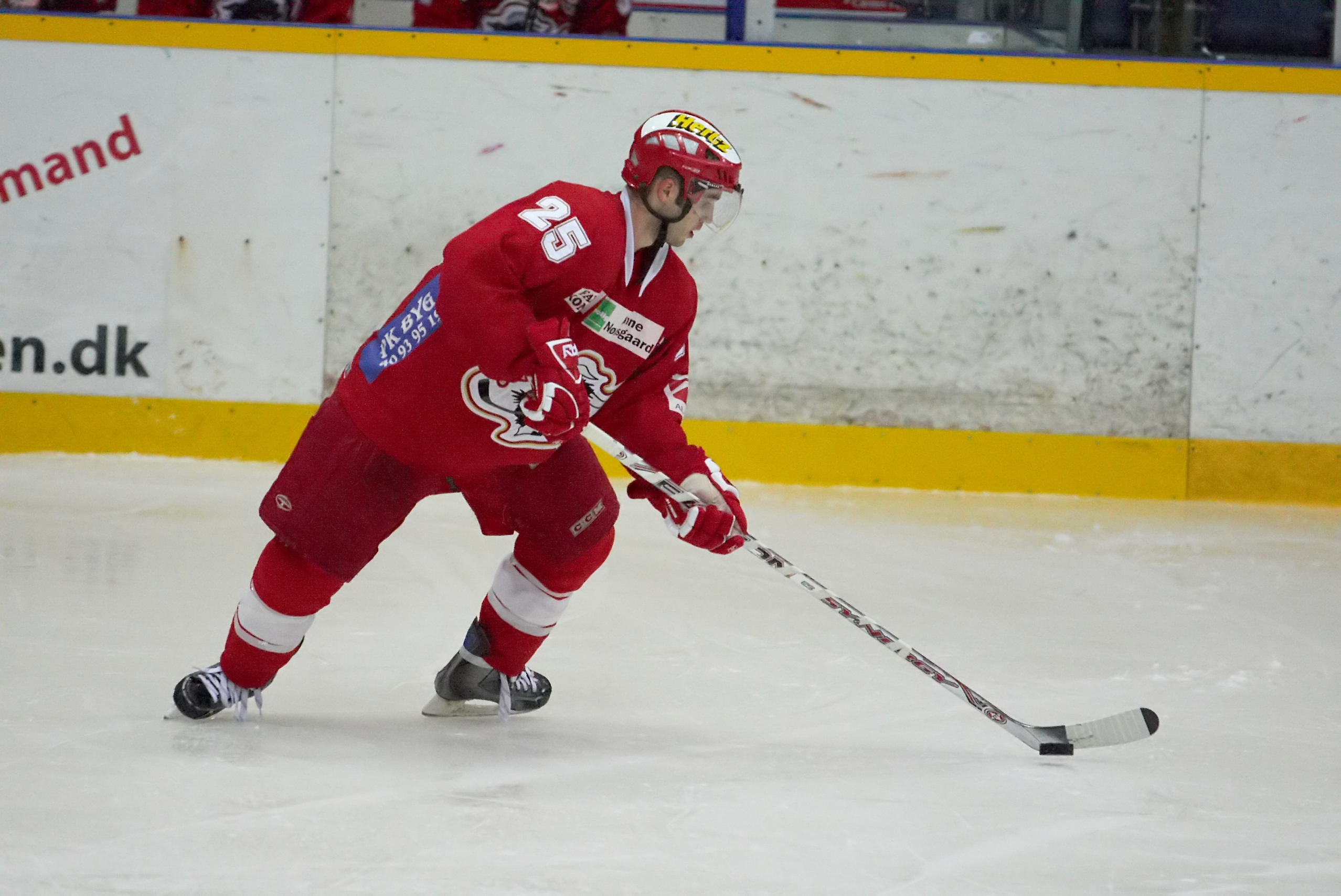
- Derek Eastman
- Born: November 25, 1980 (age 45) St. Paul, Minnesota, U.S.
- Height: 5 ft 11 in (180 cm)
- Weight: 190 lb (86 kg; 13 st 8 lb)
- Position: Defense
- Shoots: Left
- ITA3 team Former teams: HC Aosta; Columbia Inferno; Norfolk Admirals; Iowa Stars; Storhamar; Rødovre Mighty Bulls; Tulsa Oilers; HC Gherdëina; WSV Sterzing Broncos; SHC Fassa; Valdifiemme HC
- NHL draft: Undrafted
- Playing career: 2003–present

Derek Eastman (born November 25, 1980) is an American professional ice hockey player who is currently playing with the HC Aosta in the Italian Hockey League - Division I (the third-tier Italian championship). Also owns a State Farm agency in Sugar Grove, IL.

== Career statistics ==
			Regular season					Playoffs
Season	Team	League	GP	G	A	Pts	PIM	GP	G	A	Pts	PIM
1998–99	Omaha Lancers	USHL	52	12	15	27	27	12	2	5	7	6
1999–00	St. Cloud State	NCAA	17	0	1	1	16	—	—	—	—	—
2000–01	St. Cloud State	NCAA	38	7	17	24	39	—	—	—	—	—
2001–02	St. Cloud State	NCAA	42	8	18	26	20	—	—	—	—	—
2002–03	St. Cloud State	NCAA	21	3	14	17	26	—	—	—	—	—
2003–04	Columbia Inferno	ECHL	72	13	35	48	69	4	0	0	0	2
2004–05	Columbia Inferno	ECHL	64	4	19	23	97	5	0	0	0	4
2005–06	Columbia Inferno	ECHL	51	9	27	36	77	—	—	—	—	—
2005–06	Norfolk Admirals	AHL	1	0	0	0	4	—	—	—	—	—
2005–06	Iowa Stars	AHL	3	0	0	0	0	—	—	—	—	—
2003–04	Storhamar Hockey	Norway	38	5	17	22	82	17	5	11	16	36
2007–08	Rødovre Mighty Bulls	Denmark	38	5	8	13	124	6	1	2	3	18
2008–09	Rødovre Mighty Bulls	Denmark	30	4	14	18	58	15	1	6	7	20
2009–10	Tulsa Oilers	CHL	63	9	36	45	94	—	—	—	—	—
2010–11	Tulsa Oilers	CHL	66	13	38	51	112	10	2	6	8	20
2011–12	HC Gherdëina	Italy2	42	21	33	54	72	14	6	16	22	49
2012–13	Wipptal Broncos	Italy2	42	12	45	57	46	12	6	1	7	22
2013–14	Wipptal Broncos	Italy	41	10	25	35	38	6	2	3	5	4
2014–15	HC Gherdëina	Italy	39	10	19	29	50	4	0	4	4	0
2015–16	HC Gherdëina	Italy	42	9	27	36	51	5	2	5	7	6
2016–17	HC Gherdëina	AlpsHL	38	11	27	38	24	—	—	—	—	—
2017–18	HC Gherdëina	AlpsHL	33	10	18	28	46	—	—	—	—	—
2018–19	HC Gherdëina	AlpsHL	39	7	11	18	48	2	0	0	0	2
2019–20	HC Fassa Falcons	AlpsHL	44	7	16	23	26	—	—	—	—	—
2020–21	HC Fassa Falcons	AlpsHL	35	1	8	9	14	—	—	—	—	—
2021–22	HC Fiemme Cavalese	Italy2	19	6	10	16	14	11	4	8	12	12
2022–23	HC Fiemme Cavalese	Italy2	20	4	16	20	21	4	2	0	2	4
2023–24	HC Aosta	Italy3	19	8	26	34	16	5	3	5	8	8
AHL totals			4	0	0	0	4	—	—	—	—	—
ECHL totals			187	26	81	107	243	9	0	0	0	6
CHL totals			129	22	74	96	206	10	2	6	8	20
Italy totals			122	29	71	100	139	15	4	12	16	10
AlpsHL totals			189	36	80	116	158	2	0	0	0	2
Denmark totals			68	9	22	31	182	21	2	8	10	38

== Awards and honors ==
Award	Year
ECHL All-Rookie Team	2003–04
CHL All-CHL Team	2009–10
