= Tomaž Razingar =

Slovenian ice hockey player (born 1979)

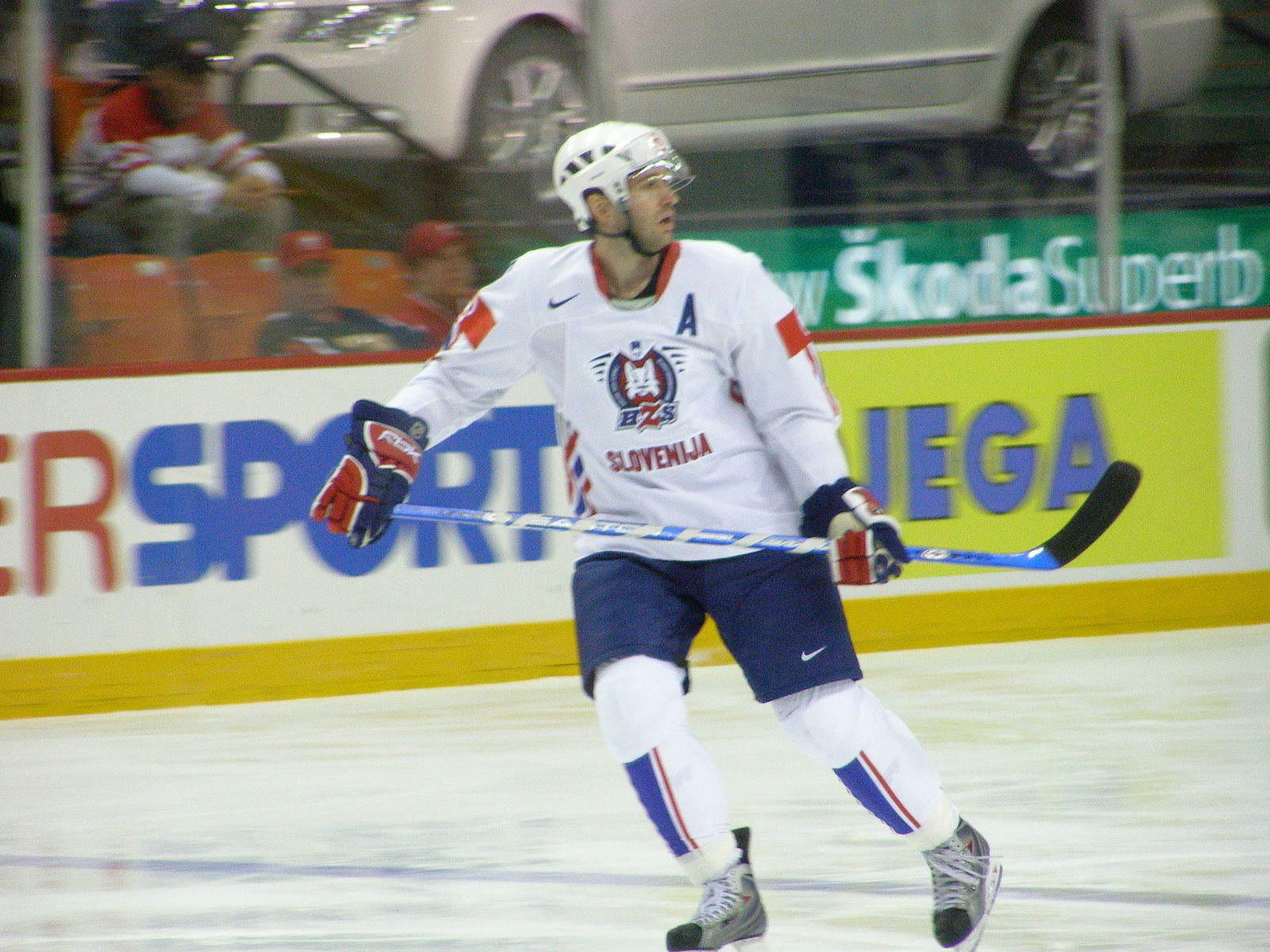
- Razingar in 2008
- Born: April 25, 1979 (age 46); Jesenice, SFR Yugoslavia
- Height: 6 ft 0 in (183 cm)
- Weight: 196 lb (89 kg; 14 st 0 lb)
- Position: Left wing
- Shot: Left
- Played for: Acroni Jesenice; Peoria Rivermen; Newmarket Saints; Worcester Sharks; VHK Vsetín; Pardubice; HC TWK Innsbruck; EC VSV; HC Pustertal Wölfe; Ravensburg Towerstars; IF Troja/Ljungby; HK Dukla Trenčín
- National team: Slovenia
- NHL draft: Undrafted
- Playing career: 1995–2015

Tomaž Razingar (born April 25, 1979) is a retired Slovenian professional ice hockey winger.

He participated at several IIHF World Championships as a member of the Slovenia men's national ice hockey team.

== Career statistics ==
=== Regular season and playoffs ===
| | | | Regular season | | | | | Playoffs |
| Season | Team | League | GP | G | A | Pts | PIM | GP | G | A | Pts | PIM |
|---|---|---|---|---|---|---|---|---|---|---|---|---|
| 1995–96 | HK Jesenice | SVN | — | — | — | — | — | — | — | — | — | — |
| 1996–97 | HK Jesenice | SVN | — | — | — | — | — | — | — | — | — | — |
| 1997–98 | HK Jesenice | SVN | — | — | — | — | — | — | — | — | — | — |
| 1998–99 | Newmarket Hurricanes | OPJHL | 17 | 15 | 15 | 30 | 18 | — | — | — | — | — |
| 1998–99 | HK Jesenice | SVN | — | — | — | — | — | — | — | — | — | — |
| 1999–2000 | Peoria Rivermen | ECHL | 51 | 2 | 13 | 15 | 44 | — | — | — | — | — |
| 1999–2000 | Worcester IceCats | AHL | 1 | 0 | 0 | 0 | 0 | — | — | — | — | — |
| 2000–01 | Peoria Rivermen | ECHL | 52 | 10 | 9 | 19 | 28 | — | — | — | — | — |
| 2001–02 | HK Jesenice | IEHL | 14 | 8 | 7 | 15 | 18 | — | — | — | — | — |
| 2001–02 | HK Jesenice | SVN | 14 | 15 | 16 | 31 | 6 | — | — | — | — | — |
| 2002–03 | HK Jesenice | IEHL | 16 | 13 | 12 | 25 | 10 | — | — | — | — | — |
| 2002–03 | HK Jesenice | SVN | 24 | 27 | 27 | 54 | 67 | 5 | 7 | 5 | 12 | 2 |
| 2003–04 | Vsetínská hokejová | ELH | 8 | 4 | 4 | 8 | 12 | — | — | — | — | — |
| 2003–04 | HC Moeller Pardubice | ELH | 32 | 7 | 1 | 8 | 4 | 5 | 1 | 0 | 1 | 0 |
| 2003–04 | HC VČE Hradec Králové, a.s. | CZE.2 | 9 | 2 | 3 | 5 | 2 | — | — | — | — | — |
| 2004–05 | HC Moeller Pardubice | ELH | 2 | 0 | 0 | 0 | 0 | — | — | — | — | — |
| 2004–05 | HC VČE Hradec Králové, a.s. | CZE.2 | 5 | 2 | 0 | 2 | 0 | — | — | — | — | — |
| 2004–05 | HK Jesenice | IEHL | 22 | 23 | 19 | 42 | 28 | — | — | — | — | — |
| 2004–05 | HK Jesenice | SVN | 16 | 16 | 15 | 31 | 67 | — | — | — | — | — |
| 2005–06 | HC Moeller Pardubice | ELH | 16 | 5 | 3 | 8 | 12 | — | — | — | — | — |
| 2005–06 | HK Jesenice | IEHL | 18 | 12 | 17 | 29 | 49 | — | — | — | — | — |
| 2005–06 | HK Jesenice | SVN | 14 | 11 | 18 | 29 | 14 | — | — | — | — | — |
| 2006–07 | HC Oceláři Třinec | ELH | 13 | 3 | 1 | 4 | 8 | — | — | — | — | — |
| 2006–07 | HK Jesenice | AUT | 46 | 20 | 29 | 49 | 63 | — | — | — | — | — |
| 2006–07 | HK Jesenice | SVN | 1 | 1 | 0 | 1 | 0 | — | — | — | — | — |
| 2007–08 | HC Innsbruck | AUT | 42 | 18 | 19 | 37 | 51 | 3 | 0 | 0 | 0 | 0 |
| 2008–09 | HK Jesenice | AUT | 54 | 22 | 28 | 50 | 32 | 5 | 3 | 2 | 5 | 4 |
| 2008–09 | HK Jesenice | SVN | — | — | — | — | — | 6 | 3 | 2 | 5 | 4 |
| 2009–10 | HK Jesenice | AUT | 26 | 10 | 8 | 18 | 34 | — | — | — | — | — |
| 2009–10 | HC Pustertal Wölfe | ITA | 9 | 1 | 3 | 4 | 4 | 7 | 0 | 2 | 2 | 2 |
| 2010–11 | EC VSV | AUT | 54 | 13 | 19 | 32 | 34 | 10 | 1 | 2 | 3 | 33 |
| 2011–12 | EC VSV | AUT | 48 | 9 | 19 | 28 | 18 | — | — | — | — | — |
| 2012–13 | HK Jesenice | SVN | 4 | 4 | 4 | 8 | 2 | — | — | — | — | — |
| 2012–13 | Ravensburg Towerstars | GER.2 | 15 | 7 | 5 | 12 | 6 | 10 | 0 | 3 | 3 | 2 |
| 2013–14 | Team Jesenice | INL | 5 | 5 | 4 | 9 | 6 | — | — | — | — | — |
| 2013–14 | IF Troja/Ljungby | Allsv | 30 | 8 | 3 | 11 | 16 | 10 | 0 | 0 | 0 | 2 |
| 2014–15 | HK Dukla Trenčín | SVK | 24 | 3 | 4 | 7 | 14 | 1 | 0 | 0 | 0 | 0 |
| SVN totals | | | 73 | 74 | 80 | 154 | 156 | 11 | 10 | 7 | 17 | 6 |
| AUT totals | | | 270 | 92 | 122 | 214 | 232 | 18 | 4 | 4 | 8 | 37 |

=== International ===
| Year | Team | Event | GP | G | A | Pts | PIM |
|---|---|---|---|---|---|---|---|
| 1995 | Slovenia | WJC C2 | 4 | 1 | 0 | 1 | 0 |
| 1996 | Slovenia | WJC C | 4 | 4 | 1 | 5 | 4 |
| 1996 | Slovenia | EJC C | 4 | 9 | 2 | 11 | 4 |
| 1997 | Slovenia | WJC C | 4 | 5 | 1 | 6 | 7 |
| 1997 | Slovenia | EJC C | 5 | 5 | 1 | 6 | 2 |
| 1999 | Slovenia | WJC C | 4 | 7 | 4 | 11 | 0 |
| 1999 | Slovenia | WC B | 7 | 1 | 0 | 1 | 2 |
| 2002 | Slovenia | WC | 6 | 3 | 3 | 6 | 6 |
| 2003 | Slovenia | WC | 6 | 3 | 1 | 4 | 2 |
| 2005 | Slovenia | OGQ | 3 | 0 | 0 | 0 | 6 |
| 2005 | Slovenia | WC | 5 | 1 | 2 | 3 | 6 |
| 2006 | Slovenia | WC | 6 | 2 | 4 | 6 | 2 |
| 2007 | Slovenia | WC D1 | 5 | 6 | 4 | 10 | 2 |
| 2008 | Slovenia | WC | 5 | 0 | 3 | 3 | 0 |
| 2009 | Slovenia | OGQ | 3 | 1 | 2 | 3 | 2 |
| 2009 | Slovenia | WC D1 | 5 | 4 | 4 | 8 | 0 |
| 2010 | Slovenia | WC D1 | 5 | 3 | 1 | 4 | 4 |
| 2011 | Slovenia | WC | 6 | 3 | 1 | 4 | 4 |
| 2012 | Slovenia | WC D1A | 5 | 2 | 0 | 2 | 4 |
| 2013 | Slovenia | OGQ | 3 | 1 | 0 | 1 | 2 |
| 2013 | Slovenia | WC | 7 | 2 | 0 | 2 | 2 |
| 2014 | Slovenia | OG | 5 | 1 | 0 | 1 | 0 |
| 2014 | Slovenia | WC D1A | 5 | 1 | 1 | 2 | 2 |
| 2015 | Slovenia | WC | 7 | 0 | 1 | 1 | 4 |
| Junior totals | | | 25 | 31 | 9 | 40 | 17 |
| Senior totals | | | 94 | 34 | 27 | 61 | 50 |

Olympic Games
| Preceded by Tina Maze | Flagbearer for Slovenia; Sochi 2014 | Succeeded by Vesna Fabjan |
