= Salo (surname) =

Salo is a Finnish surname of Laine type, literally meaning "wilderness", "grove". Notable people with the surname include:

- Aaro Salo (1874–1949), Finnish house painter and politician
- Arvo Salo (1932–2011), Finnish writer, journalist and politician
- Asser Salo (1902–1938), Finnish lawyer and politician
- Dave Salo (born 1958), American swim team head coach
- David Salo (born 1969), American linguist
- Eero Salo (1921–1975), Finnish politician
- Elaine Salo (1962–2016), South African anthropologist and academic
- Elina Salo (1936–2025), Finnish actress
- Juha Salo (born 1976), Finnish rally driver
- Kasperi Salo (born 1979), Finnish badminton player
- Mika Salo (born 1966), Finnish Formula One driver
- Niklas Salo (born 1994), Finnish ice hockey player
- Ola Salo (born 1977), Swedish singer
- Päivi Salo (born 1974), Finnish ice hockey player
- Pentti Salo (born 1941), Finnish wrestler
- Petri Salo (born 1964), Finnish educational researcher and public figure
- Robin Salo (born 1998), Finnish ice hockey player
- Roope Salo (born 2004), Finnish footballer
- Sakari Salo (1919–2011), Finnish tennis and bandy player
- Sami Salo (born 1974), Finnish ice hockey player
- Sulo Salo (1909–1995), Finnish footballer
- Teemu Salo (born 1974), Finnish curler
- Timo Salo (born 1985), Finnish ice hockey player
- Toivo Salo (1909–1981), Finnish chess player
- Tommy Salo (born 1971), Swedish ice hockey player
- Tuure Salo (1921–2006), Finnish lawyer, bank director and politician
- Vello Salo (1925–2019), Estonian theologian and essayist
- Vladimir Salo (born 1974), Kyrgyzstani football player

== See also ==
- Salonen, the corresponding Virtanen type surname
