= IHL =

IHL may refer to:

- International Hockey League (disambiguation), the name of several different defunct hockey leagues:

- International Professional Hockey League (1904–1907), central-eastern North America
- International Hockey League (1929–1936), central-eastern North America
- International Hockey League (1945–2001), across North America
- International Hockey League (1992–1996), Eastern Europe, now the Kontinental Hockey League
- International Hockey League (2007–2010), midwest North America, merged into the Central Hockey League

- Italian Hockey League, is the second level of ice hockey in Italy.
- International humanitarian law, the law that regulates the conduct of armed conflict (jus in bello)
- Internet Header Length, the second field in an IPv4 packet header
