= Vrbata =

Vrbata is a Czech surname. Notable people with the surname include:

- David Vrbata (born 1983), Czech ice hockey player
- Radim Vrbata (born 1981), Czech ice hockey player, brother of David
