= Jiří Hála =

Czech ice hockey player and sport director

- Born: 30 June 1972 (age 52); České Budějovice, Czechoslovakia
- Height: 6 ft 3 in (191 cm)
- Weight: 224 lb (102 kg; 16 st 0 lb)
- Position: Defence
- Played for: Motor České Budějovice; HC TWK Innsbruck; Vienna Capitals; EHC Black Wings Linz; Graz 99ers
- Playing career: 1990–2014

Jiří Hála (born 30 June 1972 in České Budějovice) is a former Czech ice hockey player and current sport director at HC Steelers Kapfenberg.

Hála moved to Austria in 2000, playing for HC TWK Innsbruck. After two seasons, he spent one season with the Vienna Capitals and EHC Black Wings Linz before joining Graz 99ers in 2004. In March 2008 he left Graz 99ers and moved to the Austrian Nationalliga with EC Wattens, after only 6 months he left Wattens and moved to SV Silz.

Since 2014 he is sport director at the new founded hockey team HC Steelers Kapfenberg.

Hála has dual Czech and Austrian citizenship.
