= International Hockey League (disambiguation) =

The International Hockey League (1945–2001) was a North American minor ice hockey league.

International Hockey League may also refer to:

- International Professional Hockey League (1904–1907), central-eastern North America
- International Hockey League (1929–1936), central-eastern North America
- International Hockey League (1992–1996), Eastern Europe, now the Kontinental Hockey League
- Interliga (1999–2007), or International Ice Hockey League, central-eastern Europe, replaced the Alpenliga
- United Hockey League, named the "International Hockey League" between 2007 and 2010, midwest North America
- Inter-National League (2012–2016), Austria, Italy and Slovenia
- International Hockey League (Balkans) (2017–present), Croatia, Slovenia and Serbia

== See also ==
- List of ice hockey leagues, professional and amateur leagues from around the world
