= Markus Korkiakoski =

Finnish ice hockey forward

- Born: March 4, 1992 (age 34) Yli-Ii, Finland
- Height: 5 ft 11 in (180 cm)
- Weight: 170 lb (77 kg; 12 st 2 lb)
- Position: Forward
- Shoots: Left
- ItalianHL team Former teams: Hockey Pergine; Kiekko-Laser; Hokki; LeKi; Hermes; Étoile Noire de Strasbourg; HC Litvínov; HC Poruba; HC Plzeň; JKH GKS Jastrzebie; SC Kolín; HC Stadion Litoměřice; HC Feltre; Bisons de Neuilly-sur-Marne
- Playing career: 2018–present

Markus Korkiakoski (born March 4, 1992) is a Finnish professional ice hockey forward who currently plays for Hockey Pergine in the Italian Hockey League, the second-tier league of Italy.

== Career ==
Korkiakoski began his career with Kärpät's junior team, playing in their Jr. C Jr. B and Jr. A teams between 2007 and 2013 but was unable to feature in their senior team. After three separate loan spells with Mestis Kiekko-Laser, Hokki and LeKi, Korkiakoski joined Hokki as a permanent member on May 24, 2014.

On April 28, 2017, he joined Hermes of Mestis. He left the team however in December and rejoined Hokki who were now playing in the third-tier Suomi-sarja. He registered two assists in his only game back with the team before finishing the season with French team Étoile Noire de Strasbourg in the Ligue Magnus.

On June 29, 2018, Korkiakoski signed for HC Stadion Litoměřice of the Chance Liga for the 2018–19 season, which also included a single game spell in the Czech Extraliga for HC Litvínov. Between 2020 and 2022, he played for HC Poruba, also in the Chance Liga, with a loan spell at HC Plzeň.

The following season, he played in the Polish top league until November, before returning to the Chance Liga with SC Kolín.

Korkiakoski spent the 2023–2024 season again with HC Stadion Litoměřice and the following 2024–205 season in the second-tier Italian Hockey League with HC Feltreghiaccio, winning the Coppa Italia with the latter, scoring a goal and providing an assist in the final.

He began the 2025–26 season with the Bisons de Neuilly-sur-Marne, but returned to the Italian Hockey League in November, this time joining Hockey Pergine.
