= David Vrbata =

Czech ice hockey player

- Born: July 23, 1983 (age 41); Mladá Boleslav, Czechoslovakia
- Height: 5 ft 11 in (180 cm)
- Weight: 181 lb (82 kg; 12 st 13 lb)
- Position: Forward
- Shoots: Left
- AlpsHL team: HC Egna
- NHL draft: Undrafted
- Playing career: 2003–present

David Vrbata (born July 23, 1983) is a Czech professional ice hockey player, currently playing for Italian team HC Egna of the Alps Hockey League. He played with BK Mladá Boleslav and HC Sparta Praha in the Czech Extraliga, and with HK Poprad and HKm Zvolen in the Slovak Extraliga.

His brother is the National Hockey League player Radim Vrbata.
