= 2003–04 Serie A (ice hockey) season =

Italian professional ice hockey season

The 2003–04 Serie A season was the 70th season of the Serie A, the top level of ice hockey in Italy. 15 teams participated in the league, and the HC Milano Vipers won the championship by defeating Asiago Hockey in the final.

== First round ==
	Club	GP	W	T	L	GF–GA	Pts
1.	HC Milano Vipers	28	20	7	1	175:61	47
2.	HC Bozen	28	20	4	4	140:72	44
3.	Asiago Hockey	28	20	3	5	102:44	43
4.	SHC Fassa	28	18	5	5	125:56	41
5.	HC Alleghe	28	16	4	8	109:78	36
6.	HC Meran	28	17	1	10	109:81	35
7.	SG Cortina	28	12	6	10	97:89	30
8.	SV Ritten	28	12	3	13	96:78	27
9.	HC Torinovalpe	28	12	3	13	86:101	27
10.	AS Varese Hockey	28	10	4	14	85:85	24
11.	HC Brunico	28	10	2	16	92:103	22
12.	HC Egna	28	6	2	20	69:157	14
13.	HC Caldaro	28	5	3	20	65:150	13
14.	HC Appiano	28	5	3	20	50:124	13
15.	HC Gherdëina	28	1	2	25	52:173	4

== Final round ==
	Club	GP	W	T	L	GF–GA	Pts (Bonus)
1.	Asiago Hockey	14	10	4	0	52:20	29(5)
2.	HC Bozen	14	9	3	2	57:35	28(7)
3.	HC Meran	14	6	4	4	49:35	22(6)
4.	SHC Fassa	14	5	4	5	45:42	18(4)
5.	WSV Sterzing Broncos	14	4	2	8	40:58	13(3)
6.	HC Meran	14	4	2	8	30:52	11(1)
7.	SHC Fassa	14	2	4	8	49:58	10(2)
8.	WSV Sterzing Broncos	14	3	3	8	34:56	9(0)

== Playoffs ==
Quarter-finals
Asiago Hockey	3
SV Ritten	0
SHC Fassa	3
HC Alleghe	0
HC Milano Vipers	3
HC Meran	0
HC Bozen	1
SG Cortina	3

Semi-finals
Asiago Hockey	3
SHC Fassa	0
HC Milano Vipers	3
SG Cortina	0

Final
Asiago Hockey	2
HC Milano Vipers	4
