= Salomies =

Surname list

Salomies is a surname, Salonen till 1934. Notable people with the surname include:

- Ilmari Salomies (1893–1973), Finnish archbishop
- Martti Salomies (1922/23–1987), Finnish diplomat and ambassador, son of Ilmari
- Olli Salomies (born 1971), Finnish philologist
