= Salonen =

Salonen is a Finnish surname of Virtanen type. Notable people with the surname include:

- Aleksi Salonen (born 1993), Finnish ice hockey defenseman
- Alfred Salonen (1884–1939), Finnish wrestler
- Anton Salonen (born 2003), child with Russian-Finnish dual citizenship involved in a child custody dispute, see Anton Salonen incident
- Armas Salonen (1915–1981), Finnish assyriologist
- Bill Salonen (1935–2025), Canadian junior ice hockey administrator
- Brian Salonen (born 1961), American football tight end
- Eero Salonen (1932–2006), Finnish basketball player
- Esa-Pekka Salonen (born 1958), Finnish orchestral conductor and composer
- Heini Salonen (born 1993), Finnish tennis player
- Jimi Salonen (born 1994), Finnish freestyle skier
- Juha Salonen (born 1961), Finnish judoka
- Kristiina Salonen (born 1977), Finnish politician
- Neil Albert Salonen (born 1946), president of the University of Bridgeport
- Olavi Salonen (1933–2025), Finnish athlete
- Oskari Salonen (1881–1961), Finnish journalist and politician
- Pasi Salonen (born 1985), Finnish professional ice hockey forward
- Pauli Salonen (1916–2009), Finnish Nordic combined skier
- Reima Salonen (born 1955), Finnish race walker
- Ritva Salonen (1936–1996), Finnish gymnast
- Satu Salonen (born 1973), Finnish cross country skier
- Susanna Salonen, Finnish-German film director, screenwriter and cinematographer
- Sylvi Salonen (1920–2003), Finnish actress
- Timi Salonen (born 2001), Finnish speedway rider
- Timo Salonen (born 1951), Finnish former rally driver, 1985 world champion for Peugeot
- Toivo Salonen (1933–2019), speed skater from Finland
- Vappu Salonen (1929–2017), Finnish gymnast

== See also ==
- Salomies, Salonen till 1934
- Salo, the corresponding Laine type surname
