= Timo Salo =

Finnish ice hockey player

- Born: 5 June 1985 (age 39); Naantali, Finland
- Height: 5 ft 11 in (180 cm)
- Weight: 179 lb (81 kg; 12 st 11 lb)
- Position: Forward
- Shot: Left
- Played for: KalPa; HC TPS
- NHL draft: Undrafted
- Playing career: 2004–2013

Timo Salo (born June 5, 1985) is a Finnish former professional ice hockey player. He played for KalPa and HC TPS of the SM-liiga.
