= Inter-National League =

Ice hockey league

- Sport: Ice hockey
- Founded: 2012
- Folded: 2016
- Country: Austria; Italy; Slovenia
- Last champion: Bregenzerwald (2015–16)
- Most titles: Bregenzerwald (2 titles)

The Inter-National League was an international ice hockey league that was a partnership between the national federations of Austria and Slovenia. It was created as a solution to semi-professional hockey in both Austria and neighboring Slovenia. In 2016, the league merged with Serie A to form the Alps Hockey League.

== History ==
The Inter-National League was founded on July 14, 2012 with seven teams joining the inaugural season. In Austria, seven out of eleven teams from the previous season's second tier, the Austrian National League, had left the league. Two teams, Dornbirner EC and TWK Innsbruck, were accepted into the Austrian Hockey League. The remaining teams either folded or chose to play in lower local leagues.

Acroni Jesenice was confirmed to become an inaugural member. However, due to financial problems the team informed the league that they would be folding effective August 31, 2012 (two weeks before the start of the season.)

On June 8, 2013, the league's 2013–14 season was decided and it saw the league jump from six teams to 15. After the late fold of Acroni Jesenice, Team Jesenice participated in the league this season as one of four new Slovenian clubs. The other three Slovenian newcomers were Bled, Maribor and Celje. The league also welcomed Italian sides SV Caldaro/Kaltern, Eppan Pirates, Merano Junior, Neumarkt-Egna Wildgoose and Gherdëina.

For the 2014–15 season, Maribor and the five Italian teams left the league, whereas Kitzbühel and Steelers Kapfenberg joined the competition. In addition, the teams were allowed four imports (two U-22, and two with no age limit). These imports could not have been exchanged between teams in the league.

== Scheduling ==
The inaugural INL season started on September 15, 2012, while the last game in the regular season took place on March 2, 2013. The INL playoffs semi-finals and finals were all played in best-of-five format.

The scheduling for the INL was designed to keep the travel costs at a minimum. Each team played a total of 36 games in a set of six rounds (three home games, three away against all six opponents.) The league featured a "double weekend", where opponents were played on back-to-back games during the weekend.

== Scoring ==
INL games were scored with the "three-point rule": three points for the winner after regular time, two points if teams win after overtime or shootout, and one for the loser after regular time.

== Trades and transfers ==
Transfers were permitted during the season, but only if both teams reached an agreement.

== Teams ==
Team	City	Arena	Founded
Former teams
Bled	(Slovenia) Bled	Bled Ice Hall	1999
Bregenzerwald	(Austria) Bregenz Forest	Alberschwerde	1985
Celje	(Slovenia) Celje	Golovec Ice Hall	1998
Eppan Pirates	(Italy) Eppan	Eisstadion Eppan	1981
Feldkirch	(Austria) Feldkirch	Vorarlberghalle	1945
Gherdëina	(Italy) Sëlva	Pranives Ice Stadium	1927
Jesenice	(Slovenia) Jesenice	Podmežakla Hall	2014
Kaltern	(Italy) Kaltern	Palaghiaccio Kaltern	1962
Kitzbühel	(Austria) Kitzbühel	Sportpark Kapserbrucke	1910
KSV Eishockey	(Austria) Kapfenberg	Sportzentrum Kapfenberg	2015
Lustenau	(Austria) Lustenau	Rheinhalle Lustenau	1970
Maribor	(Slovenia) Maribor	Tabor Ice Hall	1993
Merano	(Italy) Merano	Meranarena	2001
Neumarkt-Egna	(Italy) Neumarkt	Würth Arena	1963
Slavija	(Slovenia) Ljubljana	Zalog Ice Hall	1964
Steelers Kapfenberg	(Austria) Kapfenberg	Sportzentrum Kapfenberg	2014
Team Jesenice	(Slovenia) Jesenice	Podmežakla Hall	2013
Triglav Kranj	(Slovenia) Kranj	Zlato Polje Ice Hall	1968
Zell am See	(Austria) Zell am See	Eishalle Zell am See	1928

== Inter-National League seasons ==
Season	Champions	Runners-up
2012–13	Bregenzerwald	Slavija
2013–14	Neumarkt-Egna	Bregenzerwald
2014–15	Lustenau	Feldkirch
2015–16	Bregenzerwald	Lustenau
