= 2013–14 Inter-National League season =

European ice hockey match

The 2013–14 Inter-National League season was the second season of the Inter-National League, a multi-national ice hockey league consisting of teams from Austria and Slovenia. The league contained 16 teams. The league's top scorer was Dylan Stanley.

== Teams ==
- EHC Bregenzerwald
- VEU Feldkirch
- EHC Lustenau
- EK Zell am See
- HK Triglav Kranj
- HK Slavija Ljubljana
- HK MK Bled
- HK Celje
- Team Jesenice
- HDK Maribor
- ASV Kaltern
- HC Neumarkt-Egna
- HC Merano
- HC Appiano
- HC Gherdeina

== Previous season ==
- 2012–13 Inter-National League season
