= HC Steelers Kapfenberg =

Former professional ice hockey team from Kapfenberg, Austria

Kapfenberg
- City: Kapfenberg, Austria
- League: Inter-National League (2014–15)
- Founded: 2014; 12 years ago
- Folded: 2015; 11 years ago
- Home arena: Sportzentrum Kapfenberg (capacity: 4,000)
- Colours

HC Steelers Kapfenberg was a professional ice hockey team from Kapfenberg, Austria. The team played its first season in the Inter-National League in the 2014–15 season. The team was established in 2014 as a new ice hockey organisation in Kapfenberg.
