= Radim Vrbata =

Czech ice hockey player (born 1981)

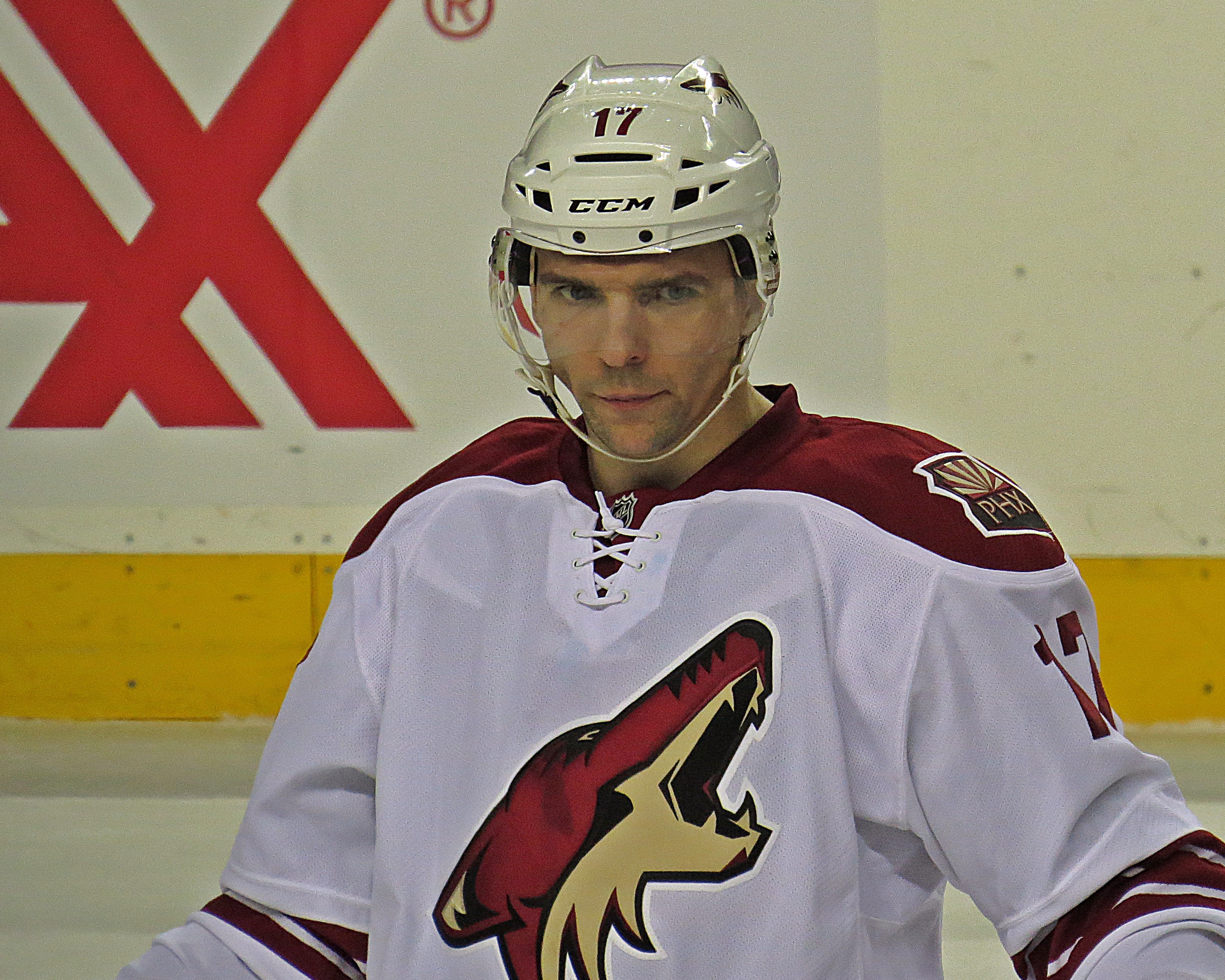
- Vrbata with the Phoenix Coyotes in 2014
- Born: 13 June 1981 (age 45) Mladá Boleslav, Czechoslovakia
- Height: 6 ft 1 in (185 cm)
- Weight: 190 lb (86 kg; 13 st 8 lb)
- Position: Right wing
- Shot: Right
- Played for: Colorado Avalanche; Carolina Hurricanes; Bílí Tygři Liberec; Chicago Blackhawks; Phoenix/Arizona Coyotes; Tampa Bay Lightning; Mladá Boleslav; Vancouver Canucks; Florida Panthers
- National team: Czech Republic
- NHL draft: 212th overall, 1999; Colorado Avalanche
- Playing career: 2001–2018

Radim Vrbata (born 13 June 1981) is a Czech former professional ice hockey player. Playing as a right winger, he had a 16-year career in the National Hockey League (NHL). Vrbata was drafted in 1999 by the Colorado Avalanche, and later also played for the Carolina Hurricanes, Chicago Blackhawks, Phoenix/Arizona Coyotes, Tampa Bay Lightning, Vancouver Canucks and Florida Panthers during his NHL career. Radim Vrbata was also an NHL All-Star in 2015.

== Playing career ==
Vrbata was drafted in the seventh round, 212th overall, by the Colorado Avalanche in the 1999 NHL entry draft. He won the 2001 World Junior Championships and the 2005 World Championship with the Czech Republic. He played his first game in February 2002 against the New York Islanders, then scored his first NHL goal against the Rangers a night later. He finished his rookie season with 18 goals and 12 assists, mainly playing with Peter Forsberg and Joe Sakic.

In March 2003, Vrbata was traded to the Carolina Hurricanes in exchange for Bates Battaglia, later being acquired by the Chicago Blackhawks on 30 December 2005, in exchange for future considerations. After two subpar seasons with Chicago, he was traded to the Phoenix Coyotes on 11 August 2007, for Kevyn Adams. During his first year in Phoenix, he set career highs in goals, assists and led the team in scoring.

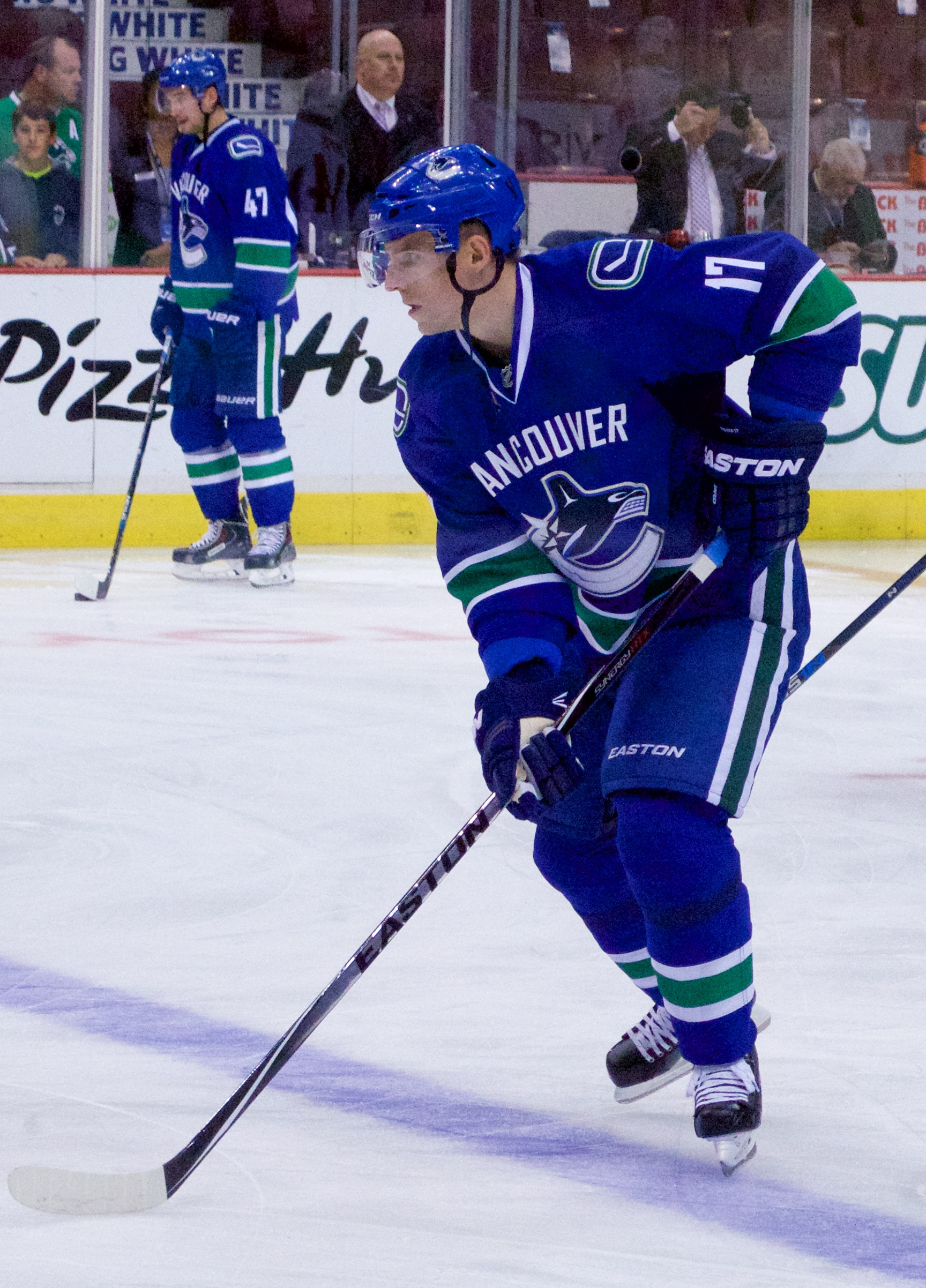
Vrbata with the Canucks in 2015

On 1 July 2008, Vrbata, as a free agent, signed a three-year contract with the Tampa Bay Lightning. After starting the 2008–09 season out of form and citing confidence issues, and the fact that his wife was having difficulty during pregnancy, Vrbata asked and was granted permission to return home to the Czech Republic on 8 December 2008. On 2 January 2009, he joined his hometown team, BK Mladá Boleslav. Vrbata's stint with Boleslav, however, was cut short when he was sent on loan to Bílí Tygři Liberec on 29 January 2009.

After finishing the season in the Czech Republic, Vrbata advised the Lightning he intended to return to the NHL for the second year of his contract for the 2009–10 season. Having already filled Vrbata's spot on the team's roster, however, Tampa Bay had no interests in retaining Vrbata and his agent, Rich Evans, was subsequently given permission to orchestrate a trade with another NHL organization. Thus, on 21 July 2009, Vrbata was traded back to the Coyotes in exchange for David Hale and Todd Fedoruk for a second stint with the team. He would total 43 goals in his next two seasons with the team, coupled with four Stanley Cup playoff goals as Phoenix qualified for the playoffs in both 2010 and 2011, losing both times to the Detroit Red Wings.

On 21 February 2012, Vrbata scored two goals in a 5–4 shootout victory over the Los Angeles Kings. His second goal gave him 30 on the season, a career high. He would finish the 2011–12 season with a career-high 35 goals in which he led the entire NHL in game-winners, with 12.

On 2 July 2014, Vrbata signed as an unrestricted free agent to a two-year, $10 million contract with the Vancouver Canucks. Vrbata stated the opportunity to play with the Sedin twins was a large factor in his decision. In his first season in Vancouver, 2014–15, Vrbata enjoyed a career year, finishing the regular season with 63 points in 79 games, besting his previous 62-point career-high season in 2011–12. He also led the Canucks in goals with 31, his second-highest single-season total behind the 35 he scored in 2011–12, and was selected to play in the All-Star Game, where for Team Foligno he scored the opening goal of the game and registered an assist in a 17–12 loss to Team Toews.

In the final year of his contract with the Canucks, Vrbata endured a disappointing 2015–16 season, producing just 27 points in his lowest offensive totals since 2009. As a free agent in the following off-season, Vrbata opted to return for a third stint with the Arizona Coyotes, agreeing to a one-year, $1 million bonus-laden contract on 16 August 2016.

During the 2016–17 season, on 25 November 2016, Vrbata became the NHL's all-time leader in shootout goals. In his return to Arizona, Vrbata led the club with 20 goals and 55 points in 81 games.

As a free agent from the rebuilding Coyotes, Vrbata signed a one-year, $2.5 million bonus-laden contract with the Florida Panthers on 1 July 2017.

On 7 April 2018, Vrbata announced his retirement from professional hockey after 16 seasons.

== Personal life ==
Vrbata's brother David is also a professional hockey player. Vrbata's son, Krystof, plays for the Czechia U17 team, BK Mlada Boleslav.

In October 2016, Vrbara co-founded Bez frází, a website where Czech athletes can publish personal essays and articles (similar to The Players' Tribune), in both Czech and English language editions.

== Career statistics ==
=== Regular season and playoffs ===
			Regular season					Playoffs
Season	Team	League	GP	G	A	Pts	PIM	GP	G	A	Pts	PIM
1997–98	TJ Auto Škoda Mladá Boleslav	CZE-2 Jr	35	42	31	73	4	—	—	—	—	—
1998–99	Hull Olympiques	QMJHL	54	22	38	60	16	23	6	13	19	6
1999–00	Hull Olympiques	QMJHL	59	29	45	74	26	15	3	9	12	8
2000–01	Shawinigan Cataractes	QMJHL	55	56	64	120	67	10	4	7	11	4
2000–01	Hershey Bears	AHL	—	—	—	—	—	1	0	1	1	2
2001–02	Colorado Avalanche	NHL	52	18	12	30	14	9	0	0	0	0
2001–02	Hershey Bears	AHL	20	8	14	22	8	—	—	—	—	—
2002–03	Colorado Avalanche	NHL	66	11	19	30	16	—	—	—	—	—
2002–03	Carolina Hurricanes	NHL	10	5	0	5	2	—	—	—	—	—
2003–04	Carolina Hurricanes	NHL	80	12	13	25	24	—	—	—	—	—
2004–05	Bílí Tygři Liberec	CZE	45	18	21	39	91	12	3	2	5	0
2005–06	Carolina Hurricanes	NHL	16	2	3	5	6	—	—	—	—	—
2005–06	Chicago Blackhawks	NHL	45	13	21	34	16	—	—	—	—	—
2006–07	Chicago Blackhawks	NHL	77	14	27	41	26	—	—	—	—	—
2007–08	Phoenix Coyotes	NHL	76	27	29	56	14	—	—	—	—	—
2008–09	Tampa Bay Lightning	NHL	18	3	3	6	8	—	—	—	—	—
2008–09	BK Mladá Boleslav	CZE	11	5	3	8	18	—	—	—	—	—
2008–09	Bílí Tygři Liberec	CZE	7	7	2	9	2	3	0	1	1	2
2009–10	Phoenix Coyotes	NHL	82	24	19	43	24	7	2	2	4	4
2010–11	Phoenix Coyotes	NHL	79	19	29	48	20	4	2	3	5	0
2011–12	Phoenix Coyotes	NHL	77	35	27	62	24	16	2	3	5	8
2012–13	BK Mladá Boleslav	CZE-2	2	1	1	2	0	—	—	—	—	—
2012–13	Phoenix Coyotes	NHL	34	12	16	28	14	—	—	—	—	—
2013–14	Phoenix Coyotes	NHL	80	20	31	51	22	—	—	—	—	—
2014–15	Vancouver Canucks	NHL	79	31	32	63	20	6	2	2	4	0
2015–16	Vancouver Canucks	NHL	63	13	14	27	12	—	—	—	—	—
2016–17	Arizona Coyotes	NHL	81	20	35	55	16	—	—	—	—	—
2017–18	Florida Panthers	NHL	42	5	9	14	16	—	—	—	—	—
NHL totals			1,057	284	339	623	294	42	8	10	18	12

=== International ===
Medal record

Men's ice hockey

Representing Czech Republic

World Junior Championships
Gold medal – first place	2001 Moscow	

World Championships
Gold medal – first place	2005 Vienna	

Year	Team	Event	Result	GP	G	A	Pts	PIM
2001	Czech Republic	WJC	1st place, gold medalist(s)	7	1	2	3	4
2003	Czech Republic	WC	4th	9	3	3	6	2
2005	Czech Republic	WC	1st place, gold medalist(s)	3	0	1	1	0
2008	Czech Republic	WC	5th	7	5	2	7	4
2013	Czech Republic	WC	7th	8	2	1	3	4
Junior totals				7	1	2	3	4
Senior totals				27	10	7	17	10
