= Italian Hockey League Division I =

- Sport: Ice hockey
- Founded: 2004
- No. of teams: 7
- Country: Italy
- Most recent champion: Chiavenna (2024–25)
- Level on pyramid: 3
- Promotion to: Italian Hockey League

The Italian Hockey League Division I (former Serie C) is the third level of ice hockey in Italy. It is below the Italian Hockey League - Serie A and the Italian Hockey League.
