= Niklas Salo =

Finnish ice hockey player

- Born: July 8, 1994 (age 32) Somero, Finland
- Height: 5 ft 5 in (165 cm)
- Weight: 152 lb (69 kg; 10 st 12 lb)
- Position: Forward
- Shoots: Left
- Liiga team: HC TPS
- NHL draft: Undrafted
- Playing career: 2013–present

Niklas Salo (born July 8, 1994) is a Finnish ice hockey player. He is currently playing with HC TPS in the Finnish Liiga.

Salo made his Liiga debut playing with HC TPS during the 2013–14 Liiga season.
