= SV Kaltern =

Kaltern
- City: Kaltern, Italy
- League: Serie A
- Founded: 1962; 64 years ago
- Home arena: Palaghiaccio Kaltern
- Colours: Red, White, Black
- Website: eishockey-kaltern.com

SV Kaltern is an ice hockey team in Kaltern, Italy. They play in the Serie A, the first level of ice hockey in Italy. The club was founded in 1962. Currently the team holds tryouts from 28 May to 7 June each year, in Florence.

== Honours ==
- Serie A2 champion: 2008
- Serie B champion: 2001
