= HC Neumarkt-Egna =

Neumarkt-Egna
- City: Neumarkt, Italy
- League: Alps Hockey League
- Founded: 1963; 63 years ago
- Folded: 2018; 8 years ago
- Home arena: Würth Arena
- Colours: Blue, red, white
- Head coach: Mike Flanagan
- Website: http://www.hc-neumarkt.com/

HC Neumarkt-Egna was an ice hockey team in Neumarkt, Italy. They last played in 2018 as members of the Alps Hockey League. The club had previously played in Serie A. The club was founded in 1963.

== Honours ==
- Inter-National League:
  - Winners (1): 2013–14
