= HC Eppan Pirates =

- City: Eppan, Italy
- League: Serie A
- Founded: 1981; 45 years ago
- Home arena: Eisstadion Eppan
- Colours: Yellow, blue
- Head coach: Tomáš Demel
- Website: hceppan.it

The HC Eppan Pirates are an ice hockey team in Eppan, Italy. They play in the Serie B, the top level of ice hockey in Italy. The club was founded in 1981. They are currently named HC Südtirol Bank Eppan for sponsorship reasons.

== Achievements ==
- IHL / Serie B champion: 2002, 2003, 2010, 2013, 2014, 2018
- Serie B2 champion: 1988, 1990, 1995
- Serie C champion: 1983, 1985, 1987
- National League: 1982
