= Italian Hockey League =

Sport competition in Italy

- Sport: Ice hockey
- Founded: 1934
- No. of teams: 12
- Country: Italy
- Most recent champion: SV Kaltern (2024–25)
- Most titles: HC Eppan Pirates (6)
- Level on pyramid: 2
- Promotion to: Italian Hockey League - Serie A
- Relegation to: Italian Hockey League - Division I

The Italian Hockey League is the second level of ice hockey in Italy. The league was founded in 1934.

The league changed his name several times:

- Serie B (1934–1941)
- Campionato italiano di promozione (1948–1965)
- Serie B (1965–1996. divided in Serie B1 and Serie B2 between 1988 and 1996)
- Serie A2 (1996–1997)
- Serie B (1997–1998)
- Serie A2 (1998–2000)
- Serie B (2000–2002)
- Serie A2 (2002–2003)
- Serie B (2003–2004)
- Serie A2 (2004–2013)
- Seconda divisione (2013–2014)
- Serie B (2014–2017)
- Italian Hockey League (2017–present)

== Champions ==
- 1935: HC Milano II
- 1936: ADG Milano II
- 1937: ?
- 1938: AMDG Milano II
- 1939: ?
- 1940: ?
- 1941: ?
- 1942: not awarded
- 1943: not awarded
- 1944: not awarded
- 1945: not awarded
- 1946: not awarded
- 1947: HC Misurina
- 1947–1948: ?
- 1948–1949: HC Gherdeina-Ortisei II
- 1949–1950: ?
- 1950–1951: HC Saslong St. Cristina
- 1951–1952: HC Saslong St. Cristina
- 1952–1953: US Valpellice
- 1953–1954: Torino HC
- 1954–1955: Asiago Hockey AS
- 1955–1956: HC Latemar Bolzano
- 1956–1957: HC Scoiattoli Bolzano
- 1957–1958: Amatori Milano HC
- 1958–1959: Amatori Milano HC
- 1959–1960: Amatori Milano HC
- 1960–1961: HC Latemar Bolzano
- 1961–1962: SSV Bolzano
- 1962–1963: HC Monte Civetta Alleghe
- 1963–1964: HC Monte Civetta Alleghe
- 1964–1965: HC Torino
- 1965–1966: SG Amatori Cortina
- 1966–1967: Torino HC
- 1967–1968: EV MAK Bruneck-Brunico
- 1968–1969: EV MAK Bruneck-Brunico and Torino HC
- 1969–1970: HC Alleghe
- 1970–1971: HC Merano
- 1971–1972: SC Ritten-Renon
- 1972–1973: SC Ritten-Renon
- 1973–1974: Rencio Bolzano
- 1974–1975: SC Renon Löwen-Starke
- 1975–1976: HC Valpellice Sestriere
- 1976–1977: Asiago Hockey AS and Turbine Milano
- 1977–1978: HC Merano
- 1978–1979: Rencio Bolzano
- 1979–1980: Selva di Val Gardena
- 1980–1981: Selva di Val Gardena
- 1981–1982: HC Fiemme Cavalese
- 1982–1983: HC Fiemme Cavalese
- 1983–1984: HC Auronzo
- 1984–1985: SHC Fassa-Canazei
- 1985–1986: SV Ritten-Renon
- 1986–1987: HC Fiemme Cavalese
- 1987–1988: HC Milano Saima and HC Eppan-Appiano
- 1988–1989: HC Como and HC Falcons Brixen-Bressanone
- 1989–1990: SG Cortina and HC Eppan-Appiano
- 1990–1991: HC Merano and HC Alta Badia
- 1991–1992: HC Gherdëina-Gardena and HC Alta Badia
- 1992–1993: HC Courmaosta and HC Pergine
- 1993–1994: SG Cortina
- 1994–1995: USG Zoldo and HC Eppan-Appiano
- 1995–1996: USG Zoldo and HC Siebeneich-Settequerce
- 1996–1997: HC Gherdëina-Gardena and Selva di Val Gardena
- 1997–1998: USG Zoldo
- 1998–1999: HC Auronzo and SV Ritten
- 1999–2000: HC Siebeneich-Settequerce and SV Ritten
- 2000–2001: SV Kaltern-Caldaro
- 2001–2002: HC Eppan-Appiano Pirates
- 2002–2003: HC Eppan-Appiano Pirates and AS Varese Hockey Mastini
- 2003–2004: HC Falcons Bressanone-Brixen
- 2004–2005: SSI Vipiteno Broncos
- 2005–2006: SG Pontebba
- 2006–2007: HC Merano
- 2007–2008: SV Kaltern-Caldaro
- 2008–2009: SSI Vipiteno Broncos
- 2009–2010: HC Internorm Eppan-Appiano Pirates
- 2010–2011: SSI Vipiteno Broncos
- 2011–2012: Hockey Milano Rossoblu
- 2012–2013: HC Eppan-Appiano Pirates
- 2013–2014: HC Eppan-Appiano Pirates
- 2014–2015: HC Alleghe
- 2015–2016: HC Merano
- 2016–2017: Hockey Milano Rossoblu
- 2017–2018: HC Eppan-Appiano Pirates
- 2018–2019: SV Kaltern-Caldaro Rothoblaas
- 2019–2020: Season was cut short due to the COVID-19 pandemic.
- 2020–2021: SV Kaltern-Caldaro Rothoblaas
- 2021–2022: Hockey Unterland Cavaliers
- 2022–2023: HCMC Varese Hockey SSDRL Mastini Gialloneri
- 2023–2024: ASD Hockey Pergine
- 2024–2025: SV Kaltern-Caldaro Rothoblaas
