= 2014 IIHF World Championship rosters =

Each team's roster for the 2014 IIHF World Championship consists of at least 15 skaters (forwards, and defencemen) and 2 goaltenders, and at most 22 skaters and 3 goaltenders. All sixteen participating nations, through the confirmation of their respective national associations, had to submit a roster by the first IIHF directorate meeting.

== Legend ==
Number	Uniform number	GP	Games played	W	Wins
F	Forward	G	Goals	L	Losses
D	Defenceman	A	Assists	Min	Minutes played
GK	Goaltender	Pts	Points	GA	Goals against
Club	Player's club before tournament	PIM	Penalties in minutes	GAA	Goals against average
		SO	Shutouts	SV%	Save percentage

== Belarus ==
A 25-player roster was announced on May 6.

- Head coach: Glen Hanlon
- Assistant coach: Oleg Mikulchik
- Assistant coach: Eduard Zankovets

=== Skaters ===
Number	Position	Player	Club	GP	G	A	Pts	PIM	+/−
5	D	Nikolai Stasenko	(Russia) Severstal Cherepovets	6	1	1	2	27	−1
7	D	Vladimir Denisov – A	(Russia) Torpedo Novgorod	8	1	1	2	12	+4
11	D	Andrei Karev	(Belarus) Yunost Minsk	5	0	0	0	0	−1
16	F	Geoff Platt	(Russia) Lokomotiv Yaroslavl	8	3	2	5	0	+1
17	F	Alexei Kalyuzhny – C	(Belarus) Dinamo Minsk	7	1	6	7	2	+4
18	F	Alexei Ugarov	(Russia) Admiral Vladivostok	8	1	0	1	0	−1
23	F	Andrei Stas	(Belarus) Dinamo Minsk	8	1	3	4	2	+3
25	D	Oleg Yevenko	(United States) UMass Minutemen	8	0	2	2	6	+3
27	F	Alexei Yefimenko	(Belarus) Dinamo Minsk	8	1	1	2	4	+3
28	F	Konstantin Koltsov	(Russia) Atlant Moscow Oblast	5	0	0	0	0	−3
37	F	Nikita Osipov	(Belarus) Metallurg Zhlobin	4	0	0	0	0	0
46	F	Andrei Kostitsyn	(Russia) Traktor Chelyabinsk	7	0	0	0	4	−1
57	D	Ivan Usenko	(Belarus) Dinamo Minsk	6	0	0	0	0	−1
61	F	Andrei Stepanov	(Russia) Amur Khabarovsk	8	3	2	5	2	0
73	F	Artem Volkov	(Belarus) Yunost Minsk	8	0	0	0	0	0
74	F	Sergei Kostitsyn	(Russia) Avangard Omsk	8	4	4	8	10	+5
77	F	Alexander Kitarov	(Belarus) Dinamo Minsk	8	0	1	1	10	−2
84	F	Mikhail Grabovski – A	(United States) Washington Capitals	6	4	4	8	0	+4
88	F	Evgeni Kovyrshin	(Russia) Severstal Cherepovets	8	0	0	0	0	−1
89	D	Dmitry Korobov	(United States) Syracuse Crunch	8	0	3	3	14	+5
91	D	Kirill Gotovets	(United States) Milwaukee Admirals	7	0	0	0	6	−1
92	D	Roman Graborenko	(United States) Albany Devils	8	0	2	2	2	+6

=== Goaltenders ===
Number	Player	Club	GP	W	L	Min	GA	GAA	SA	SV%	SO
1	Vitali Koval	(Russia) Torpedo Novgorod	4	2	1	176:14	8	2.72	75	89.33	0
31	Andrei Mezin	(Russia) Avangard Omsk	1	0	1	60:00	6	6.00	25	76.00	0
35	Kevin Lalande	(Belarus) Dinamo Minsk	5	2	2	240:37	5	1.25	80	93.75	0

== Canada ==
A 20-player roster was announced on April 17.

- Head coach: Dave Tippett
- Assistant coach: Peter DeBoer
- Assistant coach: Paul Maurice

=== Skaters ===
Number	Position	Player	Club	GP	G	A	Pts	PIM	+/−
3	D	Kevin Bieksa – C	(Canada) Vancouver Canucks	8	2	2	4	4	+6
4	D	Ryan Ellis	(United States) Nashville Predators	8	1	4	5	0	+9
5	D	Jason Garrison	(Canada) Vancouver Canucks	7	0	4	4	6	+5
7	F	Kyle Turris – A	(Canada) Ottawa Senators	8	3	3	6	2	+2
10	F	Brayden Schenn	(United States) Philadelphia Flyers	8	3	1	4	0	+2
11	F	Jonathan Huberdeau	(United States) Florida Panthers	8	1	4	5	2	+5
14	F	Alexandre Burrows	(Canada) Vancouver Canucks	6	0	1	1	4	0
19	F	Cody Hodgson	(United States) Buffalo Sabres	8	6	2	8	4	+3
20	F	Troy Brouwer	(United States) Washington Capitals	8	0	1	1	4	+2
21	F	Matt Read	(United States) Philadelphia Flyers	8	2	3	5	2	+1
23	F	Sean Monahan	(Canada) Calgary Flames	8	0	2	2	2	+3
24	D	Morgan Rielly	(Canada) Toronto Maple Leafs	8	1	2	3	0	+3
25	F	Jason Chimera – A	(United States) Washington Capitals	8	1	2	3	0	0
27	D	Braydon Coburn	(United States) Philadelphia Flyers	8	0	0	0	8	−4
29	F	Nathan MacKinnon	(United States) Colorado Avalanche	8	1	3	4	8	+3
42	F	Joel Ward	(United States) Washington Capitals	8	6	3	9	4	+7
43	F	Nazem Kadri	(Canada) Toronto Maple Leafs	8	0	3	3	4	+2
44	D	Erik Gudbranson	(United States) Florida Panthers	8	1	0	1	6	+7
55	F	Mark Scheifele	(Canada) Winnipeg Jets	8	2	2	4	0	+6
57	D	Tyler Myers	(United States) Buffalo Sabres	8	0	2	2	6	0

=== Goaltenders ===
Number	Player	Club	GP	W	L	Min	GA	GAA	SA	SV%	SO
30	Ben Scrivens	(Canada) Edmonton Oilers	4	3	1	241:07	7	1.74	112	93.75	0
34	James Reimer	(Canada) Toronto Maple Leafs	4	3	1	245:00	9	2.20	101	91.09	0
35	Justin Peters	(United States) Carolina Hurricanes	0	0	0	00:00	0	0.00	0	00.00	0

== Czech Republic ==
A 27-player roster was announced on May 5.

- Head coach: Vladimír Růžička
- Assistant coach: Jaroslav Špaček
- Assistant coach: Ondřej Weissmann

=== Skaters ===
Number	Position	Player	Club	GP	G	A	Pts	PIM	+/−
2	D	Jakub Kindl	(United States) Detroit Red Wings	10	1	2	3	6	+4
3	D	Petr Zámorský	(Czech Republic) PSG Zlín	10	0	3	3	12	0
10	F	Roman Červenka	(Russia) SKA Saint Petersburg	10	2	3	5	4	+1
12	F	Jiří Novotný	(Czech Republic) HC Lev Praha	10	1	2	3	2	+1
17	F	Vladimír Sobotka	(United States) St. Louis Blues	9	2	4	6	10	+1
20	F	Jakub Klepiš	(Czech Republic) HC Lev Praha	10	2	2	4	2	+1
23	D	Ondřej Němec – A	(Czech Republic) HC Lev Praha	10	2	5	7	2	+2
24	F	Jiří Hudler	(Canada) Calgary Flames	10	1	3	4	8	−1
26	F	Martin Zaťovič	(Czech Republic) HC Karlovy Vary	10	2	0	2	0	−1
27	F	Martin Růžička	(Czech Republic) HC Oceláři Třinec	3	0	0	0	0	0
29	D	Jan Kolář	(Ukraine) HC Donbass	10	1	2	3	2	−1
43	F	Jan Kovář	(Russia) Metallurg Magnitogorsk	10	0	1	1	27	0
46	D	Roman Polák	(United States) St. Louis Blues	1	0	0	0	0	−1
47	D	Michal Jordán	(United States) Charlotte Checkers	9	0	1	1	2	0
48	F	Tomáš Hertl	(United States) San Jose Sharks	9	3	3	6	4	0
55	D	Martin Ševc	(Czech Republic) HC Lev Praha	10	0	2	2	8	−1
60	F	Tomáš Rolinek – C	(Czech Republic) HC Sparta Praha	10	1	1	2	2	−4
64	F	Jiří Sekáč	(Czech Republic) HC Lev Praha	10	2	0	2	4	0
68	F	Jaromír Jágr – A	(United States) New Jersey Devils	10	4	4	8	14	−2
74	D	Ondřej Vitásek	(Czech Republic) HC Liberec	10	0	1	1	6	−1
82	F	Michal Vondrka	(Slovakia) HC Slovan Bratislava	6	0	0	0	0	−1
88	F	Jakub Petružálek	(Russia) Ak Bars Kazan	7	0	0	0	6	−1

=== Goaltenders ===
Number	Player	Club	GP	W	L	Min	GA	GAA	SA	SV%	SO
1	Jakub Kovář	(Russia) Avt. Yekaterinburg	1	0	1	36:24	4	6.59	13	69.23	0
33	Pavel Francouz	(Czech Republic) HC Litvínov	0	0	0	00:00	0	0.00	0	00.00	0
53	Alexander Salák	(Russia) SKA Saint Petersburg	10	5	4	576:15	22	2.29	214	89.72	2

== Denmark ==
A 24-player roster was announced on May 4.

- Head coach: Janne Karlsson
- Assistant coach: Tomas Jonsson
- Assistant coach: Theis Møller-Hansen

=== Skaters ===
Number	Position	Player	Club	GP	G	A	Pts	PIM	+/−
2	D	Phillip Bruggisser	(Sweden) Kristianstads IK	7	0	0	0	0	0
3	D	Philip Larsen	(Canada) Edmonton Oilers	7	0	1	1	4	−7
6	D	Stefan Lassen	(Austria) Graz 99ers	7	1	1	2	8	−4
9	F	Frederik Storm	(Sweden) Malmö Redhawks	7	1	1	2	0	0
11	F	Patrick Bjorkstrand	(Croatia) KHL Medveščak Zagreb	7	1	3	4	2	0
13	F	Morten Green – C	(Germany) Schwenninger Wild Wings	7	1	2	3	4	−3
17	F	Nicklas Jensen	(Canada) Vancouver Canucks	7	1	2	3	8	−6
19	F	Kim Staal	(Germany) Starbulls Rosenheim	7	2	3	5	2	−1
22	D	Markus Lauridsen	(United States) Lake Erie Monsters	6	0	0	0	4	−3
25	D	Oliver Lauridsen	(United States) Adirondack Phantoms	7	0	0	0	14	−2
28	D	Emil Kristensen	(Sweden) IK Oskarshamn	7	1	1	2	2	0
29	F	Morten Madsen – A	(Germany) Hamburg Freezers	7	0	2	2	2	−3
33	F	Julian Jakobsen	(Germany) Hamburg Freezers	5	0	2	2	2	+2
36	F	Jannik Hansen	(Canada) Vancouver Canucks	7	2	2	4	2	−3
37	F	Anders Poulsen	(Denmark) Herning Blue Fox	2	0	0	0	0	0
38	F	Morten Poulsen	(Sweden) IK Oskarshamn	7	1	0	1	0	−4
40	F	Jesper Jensen	(Sweden) Karlskrona HK	7	3	1	4	2	−2
41	D	Jesper B. Jensen – A	(Sweden) Rögle BK	7	1	1	2	8	+4
53	F	Thomas Spelling	(Denmark) SønderjyskE Ishockey	4	0	0	0	0	−1
60	F	Mads Christensen	(Germany) Eisbären Berlin	7	0	3	3	4	−4
89	F	Mikkel Bødker	(United States) Phoenix Coyotes	7	2	2	4	2	+2

=== Goaltenders ===
Number	Player	Club	GP	W	L	Min	GA	GAA	SA	SV%	SO
1	Patrick Galbraith	(Sweden) Karlskrona HK	2	0	2	120:00	9	4.50	80	88.75	0
31	Simon Nielsen	(Finland) Lukko	5	1	3	301:07	18	3.58	125	85.60	0
32	Sebastian Dahm	(Denmark) Rødovre Mighty Bulls	0	0	0	00:00	0	0.00	0	0.00	0

== Finland ==
A 25-player roster was announced on May 6.

- Head coach: Erkka Westerlund
- Assistant coach: Lauri Marjamäki
- Assistant coach: Ari Moisanen
- Assistant coach: Hannu Virta

=== Skaters ===
Number	Position	Player	Club	GP	G	A	Pts	PIM	+/−
5	D	Atte Ohtamaa	(Finland) Oulun Kärpät	10	0	1	1	4	+4
6	D	Tommi Kivistö	(Finland) Ilves	10	1	0	1	6	−2
10	D	Jere Karalahti	(Finland) Jokerit	10	1	3	4	10	0
12	F	Olli Jokinen – C	(Canada) Winnipeg Jets	10	2	3	5	4	0
13	F	Petteri Wirtanen	(Ukraine) HC Donbass	3	0	0	0	2	−1
18	D	Tuukka Mäntylä	(Russia) Metallurg Novokuznetsk	10	2	3	5	12	+4
19	F	Veli-Matti Savinainen	(Russia) HC Yugra	7	0	0	0	2	−2
21	F	Jori Lehterä – A	(Russia) HC Sibir Novosibirsk	10	3	9	12	10	+4
22	F	Miikka Salomäki	(United States) Milwaukee Admirals	10	1	1	2	18	+3
25	F	Pekka Jormakka	(Finland) Tappara	6	0	2	2	0	−1
26	F	Jarkko Immonen	(Russia) Torpedo Nizhny Novgorod	10	3	3	6	2	+2
27	F	Petri Kontiola	(Russia) Traktor Chelyabinsk	10	3	6	9	20	+3
28	F	Jyri Marttinen	(Finland) Ässät	10	0	0	0	4	−1
34	F	Olli Palola	(Finland) Tappara	10	4	0	4	8	0
38	D	Juuso Hietanen	(Russia) Torpedo Nizhny Novgorod	10	2	4	6	6	+3
40	F	Tomi Sallinen	(Finland) Espoo Blues	7	0	0	0	0	−2
42	F	Jere Sallinen	(Sweden) Örebro HK	9	0	0	0	4	−1
47	D	Ville Lajunen	(Sweden) Färjestad BK	10	0	2	2	0	−2
56	F	Erik Haula	(United States) Minnesota Wild	6	0	1	1	2	−2
61	F	Tommi Huhtala	(Finland) Espoo Blues	10	0	1	1	4	−1
71	F	Leo Komarov – A	(Russia) HC Dynamo Moscow	10	1	2	3	6	−1
81	F	Iiro Pakarinen	(Finland) HIFK	10	3	0	3	2	+8

=== Goaltenders ===
Number	Player	Club	GP	W	L	Min	GA	GAA	SA	SV%	SO
31	Mikko Koskinen	(Russia) HC Sibir Novosibirsk	1	0	1	58:12	4	4.12	26	84.62	0
32	Juuse Saros	(Finland) HPK	0	0	0	00:00	0	0.00	0	00.00	0
35	Pekka Rinne	(United States) Nashville Predators	9	5	3	543:21	17	1.88	237	92.83	3

== France ==
A 25-player roster was announced on May 5.

- Head coach: Dave Henderson
- Assistant coach: Pierre Pousse

=== Skaters ===
Number	Position	Player	Club	GP	G	A	Pts	PIM	+/−
4	D	Antonin Manavian	(France) Dragons de Rouen	8	1	1	2	6	+2
7	F	Yorick Treille	(France) Brûleurs Grenoble	8	1	2	3	20	0
9	F	Damien Fleury	(Switzerland) Lausanne HC	8	1	2	3	4	−9
10	F	Laurent Meunier – C	(Germany) Straubing Tigers	8	2	1	3	16	0
13	F	Luc Tardif	(France) Brûleurs Grenoble	6	0	0	0	0	0
14	F	Stéphane Da Costa	(United States) Binghamton Senators	8	6	3	9	6	+7
18	D	Yohann Auvitu	(Finland) JYP Jyväskylä	8	0	2	2	2	0
20	F	Eliot Berthon	(Switzerland) Genève-Servette HC	2	0	0	0	0	−1
21	F	Antoine Roussel	(United States) Dallas Stars	8	6	5	11	16	+6
22	F	Brian Henderson	(France) Ducs d'Angers	8	0	0	0	2	−1
24	F	Julien Desrosiers	(France) Dragons de Rouen	8	3	3	6	0	−2
25	F	Nicolas Ritz	(France) Ducs de Dijon	8	0	0	0	2	−3
26	D	Benjamin Dieude-Fauvel	(United States) Quad City Mallards	8	0	0	0	0	−2
27	D	Baptiste Amar – A	(France) Brûleurs Grenoble	8	2	1	3	4	−2
28	F	Damien Raux	(France) Rouges Briançon	8	0	1	1	0	0
41	F	Pierre-Édouard Bellemare – A	(Sweden) Skellefteå AIK	8	3	5	8	6	+6
55	D	Jonathan Janil	(France) Dragons de Rouen	8	0	1	1	0	−3
62	D	Florian Chakiachvili	(France) Rouges Briançon	8	0	0	0	0	−2
71	F	Anthony Guttig	(Finland) Hokki	8	0	2	2	2	−3
74	D	Nicolas Besch	(Poland) KH Sanok	8	0	1	1	8	+1
80	F	Teddy Da Costa	(Finland) Hokki	8	0	3	3	2	−7
90	D	Maxime Moisand	(Italy) Ritten Sport	0	0	0	0	0	0

=== Goaltenders ===
Number	Player	Club	GP	W	L	Min	GA	GAA	SA	SV%	SO
33	Ronan Quemener	(France) Rouges Briançon	0	0	0	00:00	0	0.00	0	00.00	0
39	Cristobal Huet	(Switzerland) Lausanne HC	6	2	2	369:19	16	2.60	163	90.18	0
49	Florian Hardy	(France) Ducs d'Angers	2	0	2	121:33	7	3.46	73	90.41	0

== Germany ==
A 26-player roster was announced on May 7.

- Head coach: Pat Cortina
- Assistant coach: Helmut de Raaf
- Assistant coach: Niklas Sundblad

=== Skaters ===
Number	Position	Player	Club	GP	G	A	Pts	PIM	+/−
2	F	Denis Reul	(Germany) Adler Mannheim	4	0	0	0	0	0
3	D	Justin Krueger	(Switzerland) SC Bern	6	0	0	0	4	−3
9	F	Tobias Rieder	(United States) Portland Pirates	7	1	0	1	0	−4
17	F	Marcus Kink – A	(Germany) Adler Mannheim	6	0	0	0	4	−3
18	F	Kai Hospelt	(Germany) Adler Mannheim	7	2	3	5	2	−1
19	F	Thomas Oppenheimer	(Germany) Hamburg Freezers	7	4	2	6	2	−1
22	F	Matthias Plachta	(Germany) Adler Mannheim	6	1	0	1	0	−2
28	F	Frank Mauer	(Germany) Adler Mannheim	7	1	1	2	4	−6
29	F	Alexander Barta – A	(Germany) EHC München	7	1	0	1	2	−5
34	D	Benedikt Kohl	(Germany) EHC Wolfsburg	6	0	0	0	0	−1
36	F	Yannic Seidenberg	(Germany) EHC München	7	0	0	0	2	−1
42	F	Yasin Ehliz	(Germany) Thomas Sabo Ice Tigers	3	0	0	0	2	−2
48	D	Frank Hördler – C	(Germany) Eisbären Berlin	7	0	2	2	6	−3
55	F	Felix Schütz	(Russia) Admiral Vladivostok	5	0	1	1	2	−3
63	F	Alexander Weiss	(Germany) Kölner Haie	6	1	0	1	2	0
71	F	Leon Draisaitl	(Canada) Prince Albert Raiders	7	1	3	4	0	−3
81	D	Torsten Ankert	(Germany) Kölner Haie	6	0	2	2	2	−3
82	D	Sinan Akdag	(Germany) Krefeld Pinguine	7	0	1	1	2	+1
86	F	Daniel Pietta	(Germany) Krefeld Pinguine	7	0	0	0	0	−2
90	D	Constantin Braun	(Germany) Eisbären Berlin	7	0	0	0	2	−6
91	D	Moritz Mueller	(Germany) Kölner Haie	6	0	0	0	2	0
92	F	Marcel Noebels	(United States) Adirondack Phantoms	7	1	0	1	0	+2

=== Goaltenders ===
Number	Player	Club	GP	W	L	Min	GA	GAA	SA	SV%	SO
30	Philipp Grubauer	(United States) Hershey Bears	2	1	1	117:58	4	2.03	51	92.16	0
33	Danny aus den Birken	(Germany) Kölner Haie	1	0	1	57:44	5	5.20	36	86.11	0
72	Rob Zepp	(Germany) Eisbären Berlin	4	1	3	244:01	13	3.20	90	85.56	0

== Italy ==
A 25-player roster was announced on April 28.

- Head coach: Tom Pokel
- Assistant coach: Alexander Gschliesser
- Assistant coach: Fabio Polloni

=== Skaters ===
Number	Position	Player	Club	GP	G	A	Pts	PIM	+/−
3	F	Markus Gander	(Italy) Bolzano-Bozen Foxes	7	2	0	2	2	0
4	D	Daniel Sullivan	(Italy) HC Asiago	7	0	0	0	6	−4
8	F	Marco Insam	(Italy) Bolzano-Bozen Foxes	7	0	0	0	0	−5
9	D	Armin Hofer	(Italy) HC Pustertal Wölfe	7	0	0	0	2	−5
10	F	Giulio Scandella	(Italy) HC Pustertal Wölfe	7	1	2	3	8	−4
13	F	Nate DiCasmirro – A	(United Kingdom) Sheffield Steelers	7	0	1	1	2	−4
15	F	Luca Felicetti	(Italy) SG Cortina	7	0	1	1	0	−1
17	D	Alexander Egger – C	(Italy) Bolzano-Bozen Foxes	7	1	0	1	2	−3
18	F	Anton Bernard	(Italy) Bolzano-Bozen Foxes	4	0	0	0	2	−2
19	F	Dan Tudin	(Italy) Ritten Sport	7	0	2	2	4	−3
21	F	Patrick Bona	(Italy) HC Pustertal Wölfe	1	0	0	0	0	0
22	F	Diego Kostner	(Switzerland) HC Lugano	7	1	0	1	6	−3
24	D	Trevor Johnson	(Italy) HC Valpellice	7	0	2	2	8	−6
25	F	Joachim Ramoser	(Austria) EC Red Bull Salzburg	6	0	0	0	27	−3
27	D	Thomas Larkin	(United States) Evansville IceMen	7	0	1	1	4	−1
41	F	Dave Borrelli	(Italy) HC Asiago	7	1	0	1	6	−3
50	D	Christian Borgatello – A	(Italy) HC Pustertal Wölfe	7	0	0	0	2	−5
53	D	Alex Trivellato	(Germany) Eisbären Berlin	6	0	0	0	2	−2
64	F	Brian Ihnacak	(Sweden) Malmö Redhawks	7	0	0	0	4	−6
74	D	Davide Nicoletti	(Italy) Bolzano-Bozen Foxes	7	0	0	0	0	−2
87	F	Nicola Fontanive	(Italy) Hockey Milano Rossoblu	4	0	0	0	0	−3
88	F	Vince Rocco	(Sweden) IF Troja/Ljungby	7	0	1	1	0	−6

=== Goaltenders ===
Number	Player	Club	GP	W	L	Min	GA	GAA	SA	SV%	SO
1	Andreas Bernard	(Finland) SaiPa	1	0	0	20:00	1	3.00	12	91.67	0
30	Daniel Bellissimo	(Sweden) VIK Västerås HK	7	1	6	398:02	23	3.47	215	90.34	0
34	Alex Caffi	(Italy) HC Neumarkt-Egna	0	0	0	00:00	0	0.00	0	00.00	0

== Kazakhstan ==
- Head coach: Ari-Pekka Selin
- Assistant coach: Raimo Helminen
- Assistant coach: Timur Mukhameyan
- Assistant coach: Yerlan Sagymbayev

=== Skaters ===
Number	Position	Player	Club	GP	G	A	Pts	PIM	+/−
2	D	Roman Savchenko	(Kazakhstan) Barys Astana	7	0	1	1	2	−4
5	D	Alexei Litvinenko – A	(Kazakhstan) Barys Astana	7	0	0	0	10	−3
7	D	Maxim Semyonov	(Kazakhstan) Barys Astana	7	0	1	1	0	−4
8	F	Talgat Zhailauov	(Kazakhstan) Barys Astana	7	1	1	2	4	−4
18	F	Fedor Polishchuk	(Kazakhstan) Barys Astana	6	1	2	3	4	−1
29	D	Alexei Vasilchenko	(Russia) Traktor Chelyabinsk	7	0	1	1	22	−2
33	F	Andrei Gavrilin	(Kazakhstan) Barys Astana	7	2	0	2	0	−1
36	F	Dmitri Upper – A	(Kazakhstan) Barys Astana	7	0	1	1	6	−3
38	D	Kevin Dallman	(Russia) SKA Saint Petersburg	7	0	6	6	0	−2
48	F	Roman Starchenko	(Kazakhstan) Barys Astana	7	2	0	2	4	−1
52	D	Anton Kazantsev	(Russia) Yermak Angarsk	7	0	0	0	2	−1
55	D	Evgeni Blokhin	(Kazakhstan) Barys Astana	7	1	3	4	4	+2
57	F	Mikhail Panshin	(Kazakhstan) Barys Astana	7	1	1	2	2	0
62	F	Vadim Krasnoslobodtsev	(Russia) Torpedo Novgorod	7	1	4	5	2	−2
80	F	Nik Antropov – C	(Kazakhstan) Barys Astana	7	1	4	5	29	−2
81	F	Konstantin Pushkaryov	(Kazakhstan) Barys Astana	5	0	0	0	2	−2
82	F	Andrei Spiridonov	(Kazakhstan) Nomad Astana	7	1	0	1	16	+1
85	F	Konstantin Romanov	(Kazakhstan) Barys Astana	7	2	0	2	2	−9
87	D	Artemi Lakiza	(Kazakhstan) Barys Astana	7	0	1	1	8	−1
88	F	Evgeni Rymarev	(Kazakhstan) Kazzinc-Torpedo	5	3	1	4	0	0
91	F	Alexei Antsiferov	(Kazakhstan) Nomad Astana	1	0	0	0	0	0
92	F	Mikhail Rakhmanov	(Kazakhstan) Barys Astana	5	0	0	0	0	0

=== Goaltenders ===
Number	Player	Club	GP	W	L	Min	GA	GAA	SA	SV%	SO
1	Pavel Poluektov	(Kazakhstan) Nomad Astana	0	0	0	00:00	0	0.00	0	00.00	0
28	Alexei Ivanov	(Russia) Spartak Moscow	4	0	4	224:41	19	5.07	152	87.50	0
31	Vitali Yeremeyev	(Kazakhstan) Barys Astana	4	0	3	197:00	12	3.65	109	88.99	0

== Latvia ==
A 25-player roster was announced on May 7.

- Head coach: Ted Nolan
- Assistant coach: Tim Coolen
- Assistant coach: Karlis Zirnis

=== Skaters ===
Number	Position	Player	Club	GP	G	A	Pts	PIM	+/−
2	D	Rodrigo Laviņš	(Latvia) Dinamo Riga	7	0	0	0	6	−2
3	F	Juris Štāls	(Slovakia) HK Poprad	6	1	2	3	6	+1
11	D	Kristaps Sotnieks	(Latvia) Dinamo Riga	7	1	2	3	8	−2
12	F	Herberts Vasiļjevs – C	(Germany) Krefeld Pinguine	7	1	2	3	4	−2
13	D	Guntis Galviņš	(Sweden) AIK IF	7	0	1	1	0	−1
14	D	Jēkabs Rēdlihs	(Latvia) Dinamo Riga	7	0	2	2	4	+3
16	F	Kaspars Daugaviņš – A	(Switzerland) Genève-Servette HC	7	2	3	5	42	+4
17	F	Aleksandrs Ņiživijs	(Latvia) Dinamo Riga	7	1	1	2	4	−2
21	F	Armands Bērziņš	(Kazakhstan) Barys Astana	6	0	1	1	0	−1
22	D	Māris Jass	(Czech Republic) Piráti Chomutov	7	0	0	0	20	+3
24	F	Miķelis Rēdlihs	(Russia) Lokomotiv Yaroslavl	7	3	3	6	2	+2
25	F	Andris Džeriņš	(Latvia) Dinamo Riga	7	0	1	1	2	−3
28	F	Zemgus Girgensons	(United States) Buffalo Sabres	6	2	0	2	29	+1
29	F	Roberts Lipsbergs	(United States) Seattle Thunderbirds	4	0	0	0	2	−1
32	D	Artūrs Kulda – A	(Russia) Salavat Yulaev Ufa	6	4	1	5	4	+2
47	F	Mārtiņš Cipulis	(Latvia) Dinamo Riga	7	0	2	2	2	−2
52	D	Jānis Jaks	(Latvia) HK Rīga	3	0	0	0	0	0
70	F	Miks Indrašis	(Latvia) Dinamo Riga	7	2	2	4	2	0
81	D	Georgijs Pujacs	(Latvia) Dinamo Riga	7	1	1	2	4	−7
87	F	Gints Meija	(Latvia) Dinamo Riga	7	1	1	2	2	−4
90	F	Koba Jass	(Czech Republic) Bílí Tygři Liberec	4	1	0	1	0	0
91	F	Ronalds Ķēniņš	(Switzerland) ZSC Lions	7	0	4	4	2	+1

=== Goaltenders ===
Number	Player	Club	GP	W	L	Min	GA	GAA	SA	SV%	SO
31	Edgars Masaļskis	(Slovakia) HK Poprad	3	2	1	178:30	8	2.69	68	88.24	0
33	Ivars Punnenovs	(Switzerland) Rapperswil Lakers	0	0	0	00:00	0	0.00	0	00.00	0
50	Kristers Gudļevskis	(United States) Tampa Bay Lightning	4	1	3	237:30	15	3.79	138	89.13	0

== Norway ==
A 25-player roster was announced on May 5.

- Head coach: Roy Johansen
- Assistant coach: Per-Erik Alcen
- Assistant coach: Knut Jorgen Stubdal

=== Skaters ===
Number	Position	Player	Club	GP	G	A	Pts	PIM	+/−
4	D	Daniel Sørvik	(Norway) Vålerenga Ishockey	7	1	0	1	4	+2
6	D	Jonas Holøs – A	(Russia) Lokomotiv Yaroslavl	7	1	1	2	4	−5
8	F	Mads Hansen – A	(Norway) Storhamar Dragons	7	1	0	1	0	−5
11	F	Andreas Stene	(Norway) Sparta Warriors	6	0	2	2	2	0
13	F	Sondre Olden	(Norway) Vålerenga Ishockey	7	1	1	2	2	+1
17	D	Stefan Espeland	(Norway) Vålerenga Ishockey	7	0	0	0	4	−1
18	F	Jonas Djupvik Løvlie	(Norway) Sparta Warriors	6	0	0	0	0	−1
19	F	Per-Åge Skrøder	(Sweden) Modo Hockey	7	1	2	3	6	+1
20	F	Anders Bastiansen – C	(Sweden) Färjestad BK	7	2	0	2	4	+1
21	F	Morten Ask	(Norway) Vålerenga Ishockey	6	3	2	5	2	+2
22	F	Martin Røymark	(Sweden) Färjestad BK	7	0	0	0	0	−6
23	D	Mats Trygg	(Norway) Lørenskog IK	7	2	0	2	8	−1
24	F	Andreas Martinsen	(Germany) Düsseldorfer EG	7	0	0	0	4	+1
26	F	Kristian Forsberg	(Sweden) Modo Hockey	7	0	0	0	2	−5
28	F	Niklas Roest	(Sweden) BIK Karlskoga	7	1	0	1	2	−1
29	F	Robin Dahlstrøm	(Sweden) Örebro HK	7	0	0	0	2	0
33	D	Nicolai Bryhnisveen	(Norway) Lillehammer IK	1	0	1	1	0	0
40	F	Ken André Olimb	(Germany) Düsseldorfer EG	7	1	4	5	0	+3
42	D	Henrik Ødegaard	(United States) Missouri Mavericks	6	0	0	0	8	0
44	F	Steffen Thoresen	(Norway) Lørenskog IK	3	0	0	0	0	0
46	F	Mathis Olimb	(Sweden) Frölunda HC	7	1	7	8	12	+3
47	D	Alexander Bonsaksen	(Norway) Vålerenga Ishockey	7	1	0	1	4	+1

=== Goaltenders ===
Number	Player	Club	GP	W	L	Min	GA	GAA	SA	SV%	SO
30	Lars Haugen	(Belarus) HC Dinamo Minsk	4	2	2	245:00	13	3.18	102	87.25	1
34	Lars Volden	(Finland) Espoo Blues	0	0	0	00:00	0	0.00	0	00.00	0
70	Steffen Søberg	(Norway) Vålerenga Ishockey	3	0	3	175:45	6	2.05	116	94.83	0

== Russia ==
A 26-player roster was announced on May 6.

- Head coach: Oleg Znarok
- Assistant coach: Oleg Kupriyanov
- Assistant coach: Harijs Vītoliņš

=== Skaters ===
Number	Position	Player	Club	GP	G	A	Pts	PIM	+/−
3	D	Andrei Zubarev	(Russia) Salavat Yulaev Ufa	6	0	0	0	0	+2
6	D	Denis Denisov	(Russia) CSKA Moscow	10	0	1	1	10	+3
8	F	Alexander Ovechkin – C	(United States) Washington Capitals	9	4	7	11	8	+6
10	F	Viktor Tikhonov	(Russia) SKA Saint Petersburg	10	8	8	16	10	+10
11	F	Evgeni Malkin	(United States) Pittsburgh Penguins	4	2	1	3	2	0
14	D	Alexander Kutuzov	(Russia) HC Sibir Novosibirsk	10	1	2	3	2	+6
16	F	Sergei Plotnikov	(Russia) Lokomotiv Yaroslavl	10	6	6	12	12	+7
23	D	Dmitry Orlov	(United States) Washington Capitals	3	0	1	1	2	+3
25	F	Danis Zaripov – A	(Russia) Metallurg Magnitogorsk	10	3	10	13	6	+7
40	F	Sergei Kalinin	(Russia) Avangard Omsk	9	2	1	3	6	+3
41	F	Nikolai Kulemin – A	(Canada) Toronto Maple Leafs	10	3	4	7	2	+3
42	F	Artem Anisimov	(United States) Columbus Blue Jackets	10	1	3	4	2	+7
44	D	Egor Yakovlev	(Russia) Lokomotiv Yaroslavl	10	1	2	3	6	+9
52	F	Sergei Shirokov	(Russia) Avangard Omsk	10	4	2	6	2	+6
63	F	Evgenii Dadonov	(Ukraine) HC Donbass	10	0	2	2	0	+1
69	F	Alexander Burmistrov	(Russia) AK Bars Kazan	10	1	0	1	4	+1
73	D	Maxim Chudinov	(Russia) SKA Saint Petersburg	10	0	1	1	4	+1
77	D	Anton Belov	(Russia) SKA Saint Petersburg	10	2	3	5	6	+10
82	D	Yevgeny Medvedev	(Russia) Ak Bars Kazan	10	0	4	4	6	+7
87	F	Vadim Schipachev	(Russia) SKA Saint Petersburg	7	3	4	7	4	+4
90	F	Andrei Loktionov	(United States) Carolina Hurricanes	1	0	0	0	0	0
92	F	Evgeny Kuznetsov	(United States) Washington Capitals	10	1	1	2	4	+3

=== Goaltenders ===
Number	Player	Club	GP	W	L	Min	GA	GAA	SA	SV%	SO
1	Anton Khudobin	(United States) Carolina Hurricanes	0	0	0	00:00	0	0.00	0	00.00	0
35	Andrei Vasilevski	(Russia) Salavat Yulaev Ufa	2	2	0	120:00	1	0.50	67	98.51	1
72	Sergei Bobrovsky	(United States) Columbus Blue Jackets	8	8	0	480:00	9	1.13	181	95.03	1

== Slovakia ==
A 25-player roster was announced on May 3.

- Head coach: Vladimír Vůjtek
- Assistant coach: Peter Oremus
- Assistant coach: Vladimír Országh

=== Skaters ===
Number	Position	Player	Club	GP	G	A	Pts	PIM	+/−
8	D	Marek Ďaloga	(Czech Republic) HC Pardubice	7	1	3	4	4	+1
9	F	Dávid Skokan	(Czech Republic) HC Slavia Praha	7	0	0	0	4	−1
11	D	Peter Čerešňák	(Slovakia) HK Dukla Trenčín	7	0	0	0	2	−2
12	D	Ivan Švarný	(Croatia) KHL Medveščak Zagreb	7	0	0	0	2	+1
15	F	Marek Hrivík	(United States) Hartford Wolf Pack	6	0	0	0	0	0
16	D	Juraj Valach	(Czech Republic) HC Slavia Praha	7	0	3	3	4	0
18	F	Miroslav Šatan – C	(Slovakia) HC Slovan Bratislava	7	1	2	3	4	+1
19	F	Michel Miklík – A	(Slovakia) HC Slovan Bratislava	7	4	7	11	0	+5
21	F	Radoslav Tybor	(Czech Republic) HC Pardubice	4	0	0	0	2	−1
22	D	Karol Sloboda	(Czech Republic) HC Vítkovice Steel	7	1	2	3	6	+3
25	F	Marek Viedensky	(United States) Worcester Sharks	7	3	1	4	4	−1
27	F	Ladislav Nagy – A	(Finland) Jokerit	7	4	0	4	6	+1
28	F	Richard Pánik	(United States) Tampa Bay Lightning	7	0	0	0	2	−5
52	D	Martin Marinčin	(Canada) Edmonton Oilers	7	1	1	2	12	+1
56	D	Vladimír Mihálik	(Slovakia) HC Slovan Bratislava	2	0	0	0	0	−2
59	F	Andrej Šťastný	(Slovakia) HC Slovan Bratislava	6	0	0	0	2	−3
65	F	Tomáš Marcinko	(Slovakia) HC Košice	6	0	0	0	6	0
71	F	Juraj Mikúš	(Slovakia) HC Slovan Bratislava	7	1	2	3	8	+5
77	F	Martin Réway	(Canada) Gatineau Olympiques	7	0	3	3	2	0
87	F	Marcel Haščák	(Latvia) Dinamo Riga	3	0	0	0	2	0
90	F	Tomáš Tatar	(United States) Detroit Red Wings	7	4	4	8	6	+5
91	D	Ján Brejčák	(Slovakia) HC Slovan Bratislava	6	0	0	0	4	+1

=== Goaltenders ===
Number	Player	Club	GP	W	L	Min	GA	GAA	SA	SV%	SO
32	Jaroslav Janus	(Slovakia) HC Slovan Bratislava	1	0	1	40:00	1	1.50	25	96.00	0
50	Ján Laco	(Ukraine) HC Donbass	7	3	3	381:06	19	2.99	172	88.95	0
88	Július Hudáček	(Czech Republic) HC Pardubice	0	0	0	00:00	0	0.00	0	00.00	0

== Sweden ==
A 25-player roster was announced on May 6.

- Head coach: Pär Mårts
- Assistant coach: Rikard Grönborg
- Assistant coach: Peter Popovic

=== Skaters ===
Number	Position	Player	Club	GP	G	A	Pts	PIM	+/−
3	D	Niclas Burström	(Sweden) Skellefteå AIK	7	0	0	0	2	+2
4	D	Tim Erixon	(United States) Columbus Blue Jackets	10	0	2	2	10	+2
9	D	Niclas Andersén	(Russia) Severstal Cherepovets	8	0	2	2	8	+2
10	D	Johan Fransson	(Sweden) Luleå HF	10	0	0	0	4	+3
11	F	Simon Hjalmarsson	(Sweden) Linköpings HC	10	1	0	1	4	−3
12	F	Joakim Lindström	(Sweden) Skellefteå AIK	9	5	6	11	4	+4
14	D	Mattias Ekholm	(United States) Nashville Predators	10	2	5	7	8	+1
15	F	Mattias Sjögren	(Sweden) Linköpings HC	10	0	0	0	6	−3
19	F	Calle Järnkrok	(United States) Nashville Predators	10	0	0	0	4	+3
20	F	Joel Lundqvist – C	(Sweden) Frölunda HC	10	1	0	1	4	0
21	F	Jimmie Ericsson – A	(Sweden) Skellefteå AIK	10	2	0	2	12	0
28	F	Dick Axelsson	(Sweden) Frölunda HC	10	0	1	1	0	−2
29	D	Erik Gustafsson	(United States) Philadelphia Flyers	8	0	1	1	6	−4
32	D	Magnus Nygren	(Sweden) Färjestad BK	10	1	4	5	2	0
40	F	Dennis Rasmussen	(Sweden) Växjö Lakers	9	0	1	1	0	0
41	F	Gustav Nyquist	(United States) Detroit Red Wings	10	4	2	6	2	+2
44	F	Nicklas Danielsson	(Switzerland) Rapperswil-Jona Lakers	10	2	2	4	2	+1
45	F	Oscar Möller	(Sweden) Skellefteå AIK	10	3	6	9	4	+3
48	D	Daniel Rahimi	(Sweden) Linköpings HC	2	0	0	0	0	0
51	D	Jonas Ahnelöv	(Sweden) Frölunda HC	3	0	0	0	0	−1
60	F	Mikael Backlund – A	(Canada) Calgary Flames	10	5	3	8	29	+3
86	F	Linus Klasen	(Sweden) Luleå HF	10	2	7	9	8	+3

=== Goaltenders ===
Number	Player	Club	GP	W	L	Min	GA	GAA	SA	SV%	SO
1	Joacim Eriksson	(Canada) Vancouver Canucks	1	1	0	60:00	1	1.00	11	90.91	0
30	Linus Ullmark	(Sweden) Modo Hockey	0	0	0	00:00	0	0.00	0	00.00	0
31	Anders Nilsson	(United States) New York Islanders	9	6	2	545:11	14	1.54	224	93.75	2

== Switzerland ==
A 26-player roster was announced on May 3.

- Head coach: Sean Simpson
- Assistant coach: Patrick Fischer
- Assistant coach: Colin Muller

=== Skaters ===
Number	Position	Player	Club	GP	G	A	Pts	PIM	+/−
6	D	Tim Ramholt	(Switzerland) EV Zug	2	0	0	0	0	−1
9	F	Thomas Rüfenacht	(Switzerland) HC Lugano	7	0	0	0	2	−2
10	F	Andres Ambühl – A	(Switzerland) HC Davos	7	1	3	4	4	−4
11	F	Benjamin Plüss	(Switzerland) HC Fribourg-Gottéron	5	0	0	0	2	−2
12	F	Luca Cunti	(Switzerland) ZSC Lions	7	1	3	4	2	−2
13	F	Kevin Fiala	(Sweden) HV71	7	0	2	2	2	+3
19	F	Reto Schäppi	(Switzerland) ZSC Lions	7	1	0	1	6	0
24	F	Reto Suri	(Switzerland) EV Zug	7	1	1	2	6	+2
27	D	Dominik Schlumpf	(Switzerland) HC Lugano	7	1	0	1	4	−1
31	D	Mathias Seger – C	(Switzerland) ZSC Lions	7	0	2	2	2	−1
34	D	Dean Kukan	(Sweden) Luleå HF	7	1	0	1	2	0
37	F	Victor Stancescu	(Switzerland) Kloten Flyers	7	0	0	0	4	−2
40	F	Etienne Froidevaux	(Switzerland) Lausanne HC	5	1	0	1	0	+2
58	D	Eric Blum	(Switzerland) Kloten Flyers	7	1	0	1	0	−2
70	F	Denis Hollenstein	(Switzerland) Genève-Servette HC	7	3	2	5	2	−2
77	D	Yannick Weber	(Canada) Vancouver Canucks	7	3	1	4	4	+1
82	F	Simon Moser	(United States) Milwaukee Admirals	7	0	2	2	6	−1
88	F	Kevin Romy	(Switzerland) Genève-Servette HC	7	1	2	3	4	−2
90	D	Roman Josi – A	(United States) Nashville Predators	7	1	6	7	2	−1
91	D	Robin Grossmann	(Switzerland) HC Davos	7	0	0	0	8	0
92	F	Sven Bärtschi	(Canada) Abbotsford Heat	1	0	0	0	0	0
96	F	Damien Brunner	(United States) New Jersey Devils	7	3	3	6	4	0

=== Goaltenders ===
Number	Player	Club	GP	W	L	Min	GA	GAA	SA	SV%	SO
20	Reto Berra	(United States) Colorado Avalanche	6	3	3	362:45	16	2.65	163	90.18	0
29	Robert Mayer	(Canada) Hamilton Bulldogs	0	0	0	00:00	0	0.00	0	00.00	0
63	Leonardo Genoni	(Switzerland) HC Davos	1	0	1	60:00	5	5.00	31	83.87	0

== United States ==
A 25-player roster was announced on May 2.

- Head coach: Peter Laviolette
- Assistant coach: Don Granato
- Assistant coach: Phil Housley
- Assistant coach: Joe Sacco

=== Skaters ===
Number	Position	Player	Club	GP	G	A	Pts	PIM	+/−
2	D	Jeff Petry	(Canada) Edmonton Oilers	8	0	4	4	4	−1
3	D	Seth Jones	(United States) Nashville Predators	8	2	9	11	6	+8
8	D	Jacob Trouba	(Canada) Winnipeg Jets	4	2	1	3	8	−5
9	F	Tyler Johnson	(United States) Tampa Bay Lightning	8	6	3	9	2	+3
10	F	Jimmy Hayes	(United States) Florida Panthers	8	0	1	1	2	−2
11	F	Brock Nelson	(United States) New York Islanders	8	5	2	7	20	+5
12	F	Kevin Hayes	(United States) Boston College Eagles	8	1	1	2	0	−3
13	F	Colin McDonald – A	(United States) New York Islanders	7	1	0	1	0	−2
15	F	Craig Smith – A	(United States) Nashville Predators	8	3	5	8	10	+3
19	F	Tim Stapleton	(Russia) Ak Bars Kazan	8	0	2	2	2	+1
21	F	Vincent Trocheck	(United States) Florida Panthers	7	0	0	0	4	−1
23	F	Drew Shore	(United States) Florida Panthers	8	1	1	2	2	−1
29	D	Jake McCabe	(United States) Buffalo Sabres	8	0	0	0	2	−2
46	D	Matt Donovan	(United States) New York Islanders	7	2	0	2	2	0
51	D	Jake Gardiner	(Canada) Toronto Maple Leafs	8	1	3	4	0	+2
53	F	Johnny Gaudreau	(Canada) Calgary Flames	8	2	8	10	2	+4
55	D	Connor Murphy	(United States) Phoenix Coyotes	5	0	0	0	0	−1
57	F	Tommy Wingels	(United States) San Jose Sharks	7	0	0	0	6	−1
65	D	Danny DeKeyser	(United States) Detroit Red Wings	8	0	2	2	16	−2
79	F	Andy Miele	(United States) Phoenix Coyotes	4	0	0	0	4	0
88	F	Peter Mueller	(Switzerland) Kloten Flyers	8	1	3	4	2	+1
89	F	Justin Abdelkader – C	(United States) Detroit Red Wings	7	3	1	4	31	0

=== Goaltenders ===
Number	Player	Club	GP	W	L	Min	GA	GAA	SA	SV%	SO
30	Tim Thomas	(United States) Dallas Stars	8	5	3	447:19	26	3.49	199	86.93	0
33	David Leggio	(United States) Hershey Bears	1	0	0	28:53	1	2.08	8	87.50	0
37	Connor Hellebuyck	(United States) Lowell River Hawks	0	0	0	00:00	0	0.00	0	00.00	0
