= Ice hockey at the 2026 Winter Olympics – Men's team rosters =

These are the team rosters of the nations participating in the men's ice hockey tournament of the 2026 Winter Olympics.

Age and clubs listed as of the start of the tournament, 11 February 2026.

== Group A ==
=== Canada ===
The first six players of Canada's roster were announced on June 16, 2025. The remainder of the team was named on December 31, 2025. On February 3, 2026, Anthony Cirelli was ruled out due to injury, with Sam Bennett named as his replacement. On February 5, Brayden Point was also ruled out and replaced by Seth Jarvis. On February 8, 2026, Canada named Sidney Crosby as team captain, with Connor McDavid and Cale Makar serving as alternate captains. Following an injury to Crosby in Canada's quarterfinal game against Czechia, McDavid served as captain for their semifinal game against Finland and the gold medal game against the United States, with Nathan MacKinnon serving as an additional alternate captain for both games.

Head coach: Jon Cooper

No.	Pos.	Name	Height	Weight	Birthdate	Team
6	D	Travis Sanheim	1.93 m (6 ft 4 in)	101 kg (223 lb)	29 March 1996 (aged 29)	(United States) Philadelphia Flyers
7	D	Devon Toews	1.85 m (6 ft 1 in)	87 kg (192 lb)	21 February 1994 (aged 31)	(United States) Colorado Avalanche
8	D	Cale Makar – A	1.83 m (6 ft 0 in)	85 kg (187 lb)	30 October 1998 (aged 27)	(United States) Colorado Avalanche
9	F	Sam Bennett	1.85 m (6 ft 1 in)	88 kg (194 lb)	20 June 1996 (aged 29)	(United States) Florida Panthers
10	F	Nick Suzuki	1.80 m (5 ft 11 in)	94 kg (207 lb)	10 August 1999 (aged 26)	(Canada) Montreal Canadiens
13	F	Sam Reinhart	1.85 m (6 ft 1 in)	89 kg (196 lb)	6 November 1995 (aged 30)	(United States) Florida Panthers
14	F	Bo Horvat	1.85 m (6 ft 1 in)	98 kg (216 lb)	5 April 1995 (aged 30)	(United States) New York Islanders
17	F	Macklin Celebrini	1.83 m (6 ft 0 in)	86 kg (190 lb)	13 June 2006 (aged 19)	(United States) San Jose Sharks
20	D	Thomas Harley	1.91 m (6 ft 3 in)	96 kg (212 lb)	19 August 2001 (aged 24)	(United States) Dallas Stars
24	F	Seth Jarvis	1.78 m (5 ft 10 in)	82 kg (181 lb)	1 February 2002 (aged 24)	(United States) Carolina Hurricanes
27	D	Shea Theodore	1.88 m (6 ft 2 in)	90 kg (198 lb)	3 August 1995 (aged 30)	(United States) Vegas Golden Knights
29	F	Nathan MacKinnon – A	1.83 m (6 ft 0 in)	91 kg (201 lb)	1 September 1995 (aged 30)	(United States) Colorado Avalanche
35	G	Darcy Kuemper	1.96 m (6 ft 5 in)	97 kg (214 lb)	5 May 1990 (aged 35)	(United States) Los Angeles Kings
38	F	Brandon Hagel	1.88 m (6 ft 2 in)	82 kg (181 lb)	27 August 1998 (aged 27)	(United States) Tampa Bay Lightning
43	F	Tom Wilson	1.93 m (6 ft 4 in)	103 kg (227 lb)	29 March 1994 (aged 31)	(United States) Washington Capitals
44	D	Josh Morrissey	1.83 m (6 ft 0 in)	89 kg (196 lb)	28 March 1995 (aged 30)	(Canada) Winnipeg Jets
48	G	Logan Thompson	1.93 m (6 ft 4 in)	94 kg (207 lb)	25 February 1997 (aged 28)	(United States) Washington Capitals
50	G	Jordan Binnington	1.88 m (6 ft 2 in)	78 kg (172 lb)	11 July 1993 (aged 32)	(United States) St. Louis Blues
55	D	Colton Parayko	1.98 m (6 ft 6 in)	104 kg (229 lb)	12 May 1993 (aged 32)	(United States) St. Louis Blues
61	F	Mark Stone	1.93 m (6 ft 4 in)	95 kg (209 lb)	13 May 1992 (aged 33)	(United States) Vegas Golden Knights
63	F	Brad Marchand	1.75 m (5 ft 9 in)	80 kg (176 lb)	11 May 1988 (aged 37)	(United States) Florida Panthers
87	F	Sidney Crosby – C	1.80 m (5 ft 11 in)	91 kg (201 lb)	7 August 1987 (aged 38)	(United States) Pittsburgh Penguins
89	D	Drew Doughty	1.85 m (6 ft 1 in)	95 kg (209 lb)	8 December 1989 (aged 36)	(United States) Los Angeles Kings
93	F	Mitch Marner	1.83 m (6 ft 0 in)	82 kg (181 lb)	5 May 1997 (aged 28)	(United States) Vegas Golden Knights
97	F	Connor McDavid – A / C	1.85 m (6 ft 1 in)	88 kg (194 lb)	13 January 1997 (aged 29)	(Canada) Edmonton Oilers

=== Czechia ===
The first six players of Czechia's roster were announced on 16 June 2025. The remaining roster was named on 6 January 2026. On 7 February, Pavel Zacha was ruled out due to injury, with Filip Chlapík named as his replacement. On 8 February, Roman Červenka was named Czechia's captain, with Radko Gudas and David Pastrňák serving as alternate captains.

Head coach: Radim Rulík

No.	Pos.	Name	Height	Weight	Birthdate	Team
1	G	Lukáš Dostál	1.85 m (6 ft 1 in)	86 kg (190 lb)	22 June 2000 (aged 25)	(United States) Anaheim Ducks
3	D	Radko Gudas – A	1.83 m (6 ft 0 in)	94 kg (207 lb)	30 June 1990 (aged 35)	(United States) Anaheim Ducks
6	D	Michal Kempný	1.83 m (6 ft 0 in)	89 kg (196 lb)	8 September 1990 (aged 35)	(Sweden) Brynäs IF
7	D	David Špaček	1.83 m (6 ft 0 in)	86 kg (190 lb)	18 February 2003 (aged 22)	(United States) Iowa Wild
10	F	Roman Červenka – C	1.80 m (5 ft 11 in)	88 kg (194 lb)	10 December 1985 (aged 40)	(Czech Republic) Dynamo Pardubice
12	F	Radek Faksa	1.91 m (6 ft 3 in)	98 kg (216 lb)	9 January 1994 (aged 32)	(United States) Dallas Stars
14	F	Filip Chlapík	1.88 m (6 ft 2 in)	96 kg (212 lb)	3 June 1997 (aged 28)	(Czech Republic) Sparta Praha
17	D	Filip Hronek	1.83 m (6 ft 0 in)	85 kg (187 lb)	2 November 1997 (aged 28)	(Canada) Vancouver Canucks
18	F	Ondřej Palát	1.78 m (5 ft 10 in)	93 kg (205 lb)	28 March 1991 (aged 34)	(United States) New York Islanders
19	F	Jakub Flek	1.73 m (5 ft 8 in)	78 kg (172 lb)	24 December 1992 (aged 33)	(Czech Republic) Kometa Brno
23	F	Lukáš Sedlák	1.83 m (6 ft 0 in)	98 kg (216 lb)	25 February 1993 (aged 32)	(Czech Republic) Dynamo Pardubice
26	D	Jiří Ticháček	1.75 m (5 ft 9 in)	77 kg (170 lb)	30 January 2003 (aged 23)	(Finland) Oulun Kärpät
44	D	Jan Rutta	1.91 m (6 ft 3 in)	93 kg (205 lb)	29 July 1990 (aged 35)	(Switzerland) Genève-Servette HC
48	F	Tomáš Hertl	1.91 m (6 ft 3 in)	97 kg (214 lb)	12 November 1993 (aged 32)	(United States) Vegas Golden Knights
50	G	Karel Vejmelka	1.93 m (6 ft 4 in)	102 kg (225 lb)	25 May 1996 (aged 29)	(United States) Utah Mammoth
51	D	Radim Šimek	1.83 m (6 ft 0 in)	93 kg (205 lb)	20 September 1992 (aged 33)	(Czech Republic) Bílí Tygři Liberec
64	F	David Kämpf	1.88 m (6 ft 2 in)	90 kg (198 lb)	12 January 1995 (aged 31)	(Canada) Vancouver Canucks
80	G	Daniel Vladař	1.96 m (6 ft 5 in)	95 kg (209 lb)	20 August 1997 (aged 28)	(United States) Philadelphia Flyers
73	F	Ondřej Kaše	1.83 m (6 ft 0 in)	85 kg (187 lb)	8 November 1995 (aged 30)	(Czech Republic) HC Litvínov
81	F	Dominik Kubalík	1.88 m (6 ft 2 in)	86 kg (190 lb)	21 August 1995 (aged 30)	(Switzerland) EV Zug
84	D	Tomáš Kundrátek	1.88 m (6 ft 2 in)	91 kg (201 lb)	26 December 1989 (aged 36)	(Czech Republic) Oceláři Třinec
88	F	David Pastrňák – A	1.83 m (6 ft 0 in)	90 kg (198 lb)	26 May 1996 (aged 29)	(United States) Boston Bruins
93	F	Matěj Stránský	1.93 m (6 ft 4 in)	98 kg (216 lb)	11 July 1993 (aged 32)	(Switzerland) HC Davos
96	F	David Tomášek	1.88 m (6 ft 2 in)	95 kg (209 lb)	10 February 1996 (aged 30)	(Sweden) Färjestad BK
98	F	Martin Nečas	1.88 m (6 ft 2 in)	88 kg (194 lb)	15 January 1999 (aged 27)	(United States) Colorado Avalanche

=== France ===
The first six players of France's roster were announced on 16 June 2025. France's full roster was later revealed on 23 December 2025. Pierre-Édouard Bellemare served as France's captain, continuing in the role from Olympic qualifiers in 2024. Yohann Auvitu, Stéphane Da Costa, and Alexandre Texier served as alternate captains.

Head coach: Yorick Treille

No.	Pos.	Name	Height	Weight	Birthdate	Team
3	F	Charles Bertrand	1.85 m (6 ft 1 in)	92 kg (203 lb)	5 February 1991 (aged 34)	(Finland) Vaasan Sport
5	D	Enzo Guebey	1.83 m (6 ft 0 in)	88 kg (194 lb)	6 May 1999 (aged 26)	(Switzerland) HC Davos
7	D	Pierre Crinon	1.96 m (6 ft 5 in)	102 kg (225 lb)	2 August 1995 (aged 29)	(France) Brûleurs de Loups
8	D	Hugo Gallet	1.93 m (6 ft 4 in)	93 kg (205 lb)	20 June 1997 (aged 28)	(Finland) KalPa
14	F	Stéphane Da Costa – A	1.80 m (5 ft 11 in)	82 kg (181 lb)	11 July 1989 (aged 36)	(Russia) Avtomobilist Yekaterinburg
18	D	Yohann Auvitu – A	1.83 m (6 ft 0 in)	88 kg (194 lb)	27 July 1989 (aged 36)	(Austria) Black Wings Linz
19	D	Enzo Cantagallo	1.80 m (5 ft 11 in)	85 kg (187 lb)	19 October 1998 (aged 27)	(France) Spartiates de Marseille
24	F	Justin Addamo	1.98 m (6 ft 6 in)	112 kg (247 lb)	27 May 1998 (aged 27)	(Finland) Jukurit
25	F	Nicolas Ritz	1.80 m (5 ft 11 in)	88 kg (194 lb)	26 February 1992 (aged 33)	(France) Ducs d'Angers
27	D	Jules Boscq	1.83 m (6 ft 0 in)	81 kg (179 lb)	22 February 2002 (aged 23)	(France) Boxers de Bordeaux
29	F	Louis Boudon	1.80 m (5 ft 11 in)	85 kg (187 lb)	4 October 1998 (aged 26)	(Finland) Jukurit
30	G	Antoine Keller	1.88 m (6 ft 2 in)	74 kg (163 lb)	6 October 2004 (aged 21)	(Switzerland) HC Ajoie
33	G	Julian Junca	1.96 m (6 ft 5 in)	97 kg (214 lb)	15 February 1998 (aged 27)	(Slovakia) Dukla Trenčín
36	G	Martin Neckar	1.83 m (6 ft 0 in)	80 kg (176 lb)	12 September 2005 (aged 20)	(Switzerland) SCL Tigers
41	F	Pierre-Édouard Bellemare – C	1.83 m (6 ft 0 in)	84 kg (185 lb)	6 March 1985 (aged 40)	(Switzerland) HC Ajoie
62	D	Florian Chakiachvili	1.85 m (6 ft 1 in)	86 kg (190 lb)	18 March 1992 (aged 33)	(France) Dragons de Rouen
72	F	Jordann Perret	1.78 m (5 ft 10 in)	81 kg (179 lb)	15 October 1994 (aged 31)	(Czech Republic) Mountfield HK
74	D	Thomas Thiry	1.91 m (6 ft 3 in)	105 kg (231 lb)	9 September 1997 (aged 27)	(Switzerland) HC Ajoie
77	F	Sacha Treille	1.91 m (6 ft 3 in)	80 kg (176 lb)	6 November 1987 (aged 37)	(France) Brûleurs de Loups
78	F	Dylan Fabre	1.78 m (5 ft 10 in)	78 kg (172 lb)	10 November 2000 (aged 24)	(Finland) Porin Ässät
81	F	Anthony Rech	1.80 m (5 ft 11 in)	86 kg (190 lb)	9 July 1992 (aged 32)	(France) Dragons de Rouen
85	F	Alexandre Texier – A	1.85 m (6 ft 1 in)	88 kg (194 lb)	13 September 1999 (aged 26)	(Canada) Montreal Canadiens
90	F	Aurélien Dair	1.88 m (6 ft 2 in)	84 kg (185 lb)	10 September 1999 (aged 25)	(France) Brûleurs de Loups
91	F	Floran Douay	1.91 m (6 ft 3 in)	98 kg (216 lb)	7 February 1995 (aged 30)	(Switzerland) Lausanne HC
95	F	Kévin Bozon	1.88 m (6 ft 2 in)	90 kg (198 lb)	30 December 1995 (aged 29)	(Switzerland) HC Ajoie

=== Switzerland ===
The first six players of Switzerland's roster were announced on 16 June 2025. The rest of the roster was announced on 7 January 2026. On 10 February, Roman Josi was named Switzerland's captain, with Kevin Fiala, Andrea Glauser, Nico Hischier, and Nino Niederreiter named alternate captains.

Head coach: Patrick Fischer

No.	Pos.	Name	Height	Weight	Birthdate	Team
8	F	Simon Knak	1.85 m (6 ft 1 in)	92 kg (203 lb)	27 January 2002 (aged 24)	(Switzerland) HC Davos
9	F	Damien Riat	1.83 m (6 ft 0 in)	85 kg (187 lb)	26 February 1997 (aged 28)	(Switzerland) Lausanne HC
13	F	Nico Hischier – A	1.85 m (6 ft 1 in)	91 kg (201 lb)	4 January 1999 (aged 27)	(United States) New Jersey Devils
14	D	Dean Kukan	1.88 m (6 ft 2 in)	89 kg (196 lb)	8 July 1993 (aged 32)	(Switzerland) ZSC Lions
17	F	Ken Jäger	1.85 m (6 ft 1 in)	83 kg (183 lb)	30 May 1998 (aged 27)	(Switzerland) Lausanne HC
20	G	Reto Berra	1.96 m (6 ft 5 in)	100 kg (220 lb)	3 January 1987 (aged 39)	(Switzerland) HC Fribourg-Gottéron
21	F	Kevin Fiala – A	1.80 m (5 ft 11 in)	93 kg (205 lb)	22 July 1996 (aged 29)	(United States) Los Angeles Kings
22	F	Nino Niederreiter – A	1.88 m (6 ft 2 in)	99 kg (218 lb)	8 September 1992 (aged 33)	(Canada) Winnipeg Jets
23	F	Philipp Kurashev	1.83 m (6 ft 0 in)	86 kg (190 lb)	12 October 1999 (aged 26)	(United States) San Jose Sharks
28	F	Timo Meier	1.83 m (6 ft 0 in)	100 kg (220 lb)	8 October 1996 (aged 29)	(United States) New Jersey Devils
40	G	Akira Schmid	1.96 m (6 ft 5 in)	86 kg (190 lb)	12 May 2000 (aged 25)	(United States) Vegas Golden Knights
43	D	Andrea Glauser – A	1.83 m (6 ft 0 in)	86 kg (190 lb)	3 April 1996 (aged 29)	(Switzerland) HC Fribourg-Gottéron
44	F	Pius Suter	1.80 m (5 ft 11 in)	80 kg (176 lb)	24 May 1996 (aged 29)	(United States) St. Louis Blues
45	D	Michael Fora	1.93 m (6 ft 4 in)	97 kg (214 lb)	30 October 1995 (aged 30)	(Switzerland) HC Davos
54	D	Christian Marti	1.91 m (6 ft 3 in)	98 kg (216 lb)	29 March 1993 (aged 32)	(Switzerland) ZSC Lions
56	D	Tim Berni	1.83 m (6 ft 0 in)	87 kg (192 lb)	11 February 2000 (aged 26)	(Switzerland) Genève-Servette HC
62	F	Denis Malgin	1.75 m (5 ft 9 in)	81 kg (179 lb)	18 January 1997 (aged 29)	(Switzerland) ZSC Lions
63	G	Leonardo Genoni	1.83 m (6 ft 0 in)	86 kg (190 lb)	28 August 1987 (aged 38)	(Switzerland) EV Zug
71	D	Jonas Siegenthaler	1.88 m (6 ft 2 in)	99 kg (218 lb)	6 May 1997 (aged 28)	(United States) New Jersey Devils
73	F	Sandro Schmid	1.80 m (5 ft 11 in)	82 kg (181 lb)	3 June 2000 (aged 25)	(Switzerland) HC Fribourg-Gottéron
79	F	Calvin Thürkauf	1.88 m (6 ft 2 in)	97 kg (214 lb)	27 June 1997 (aged 28)	(Switzerland) HC Lugano
85	F	Sven Andrighetto	1.78 m (5 ft 10 in)	84 kg (185 lb)	21 March 1992 (aged 33)	(Switzerland) ZSC Lions
86	D	J.J. Moser	1.88 m (6 ft 2 in)	83 kg (183 lb)	6 June 2000 (aged 25)	(United States) Tampa Bay Lightning
88	F	Christoph Bertschy	1.78 m (5 ft 10 in)	84 kg (185 lb)	5 April 1994 (aged 31)	(Switzerland) HC Fribourg-Gottéron
90	D	Roman Josi – C	1.88 m (6 ft 2 in)	91 kg (201 lb)	1 June 1990 (aged 35)	(United States) Nashville Predators

== Group B ==
=== Finland ===
The first six players of Finland's roster were announced on 16 June 2025. Aleksander Barkov was initially one of the six named to the roster on 16 June 2025, but suffered a torn ACL and MCL during training camp for the 2025–26 NHL season. He was subsequently ruled out for the following seven to nine months, including the Olympics. The final roster was named on 2 January 2026. On 3 February, Ukko-Pekka Luukkonen was ruled out due to injury, and was replaced by Joonas Korpisalo. On 8 February, Mikael Granlund was named Finland's captain, with Sebastian Aho and Mikko Rantanen serving as alternate captains.

Head coach: Antti Pennanen

No.	Pos.	Name	Height	Weight	Birthdate	Team
3	D	Olli Määttä	1.88 m (6 ft 2 in)	94 kg (207 lb)	22 August 1994 (aged 31)	(United States) Utah Mammoth
4	D	Mikko Lehtonen	1.83 m (6 ft 0 in)	89 kg (196 lb)	16 January 1994 (aged 32)	(Switzerland) ZSC Lions
10	D	Henri Jokiharju	1.83 m (6 ft 0 in)	91 kg (201 lb)	17 June 1999 (aged 26)	(United States) Boston Bruins
15	F	Anton Lundell	1.85 m (6 ft 1 in)	89 kg (196 lb)	3 October 2001 (aged 24)	(United States) Florida Panthers
20	F	Sebastian Aho – A	1.83 m (6 ft 0 in)	82 kg (181 lb)	26 July 1997 (aged 28)	(United States) Carolina Hurricanes
23	D	Esa Lindell	1.93 m (6 ft 4 in)	98 kg (216 lb)	23 May 1994 (aged 31)	(United States) Dallas Stars
24	F	Roope Hintz	1.93 m (6 ft 4 in)	97 kg (214 lb)	17 November 1996 (aged 29)	(United States) Dallas Stars
27	F	Eetu Luostarinen	1.93 m (6 ft 4 in)	87 kg (192 lb)	2 September 1998 (aged 27)	(United States) Florida Panthers
28	F	Eeli Tolvanen	1.78 m (5 ft 10 in)	87 kg (192 lb)	22 April 1999 (aged 26)	(United States) Seattle Kraken
32	G	Kevin Lankinen	1.88 m (6 ft 2 in)	90 kg (198 lb)	28 April 1995 (aged 30)	(Canada) Vancouver Canucks
33	D	Nikolas Matinpalo	1.91 m (6 ft 3 in)	97 kg (214 lb)	5 October 1998 (aged 27)	(Canada) Ottawa Senators
40	F	Joel Armia	1.93 m (6 ft 4 in)	98 kg (216 lb)	31 May 1993 (aged 32)	(United States) Los Angeles Kings
41	D	Miro Heiskanen	1.88 m (6 ft 2 in)	89 kg (196 lb)	18 July 1999 (aged 26)	(United States) Dallas Stars
55	D	Rasmus Ristolainen	1.96 m (6 ft 5 in)	94 kg (207 lb)	27 October 1994 (aged 31)	(United States) Philadelphia Flyers
56	F	Erik Haula	1.80 m (5 ft 11 in)	86 kg (190 lb)	23 March 1991 (aged 34)	(United States) Nashville Predators
62	F	Artturi Lehkonen	1.80 m (5 ft 11 in)	81 kg (179 lb)	4 July 1995 (aged 30)	(United States) Colorado Avalanche
64	F	Mikael Granlund – C	1.78 m (5 ft 10 in)	84 kg (185 lb)	26 February 1992 (aged 33)	(United States) Anaheim Ducks
70	G	Joonas Korpisalo	1.93 m (6 ft 4 in)	91 kg (201 lb)	28 April 1994 (aged 31)	(United States) Boston Bruins
74	G	Juuse Saros	1.80 m (5 ft 11 in)	81 kg (179 lb)	19 April 1995 (aged 30)	(United States) Nashville Predators
77	D	Niko Mikkola	2.01 m (6 ft 7 in)	92 kg (203 lb)	27 April 1996 (aged 29)	(United States) Florida Panthers
84	F	Kaapo Kakko	1.85 m (6 ft 1 in)	97 kg (214 lb)	13 February 2001 (aged 24)	(United States) Seattle Kraken
86	F	Teuvo Teräväinen	1.80 m (5 ft 11 in)	86 kg (190 lb)	11 September 1994 (aged 31)	(United States) Chicago Blackhawks
91	F	Oliver Kapanen	1.88 m (6 ft 2 in)	88 kg (194 lb)	29 July 2003 (aged 22)	(Canada) Montreal Canadiens
94	F	Joel Kiviranta	1.80 m (5 ft 11 in)	84 kg (185 lb)	23 March 1996 (aged 29)	(United States) Colorado Avalanche
96	F	Mikko Rantanen – A	1.96 m (6 ft 5 in)	97 kg (214 lb)	29 October 1996 (aged 29)	(United States) Dallas Stars

=== Italy ===
The first six players of Italy's roster were announced on 16 June 2025. The remainder of the roster was named on 20 January 2026. The host nation was the only team in the tournament with no current National Hockey League (NHL) players on the roster, with goaltender and Anaheim Ducks prospect Damian Clara the only player signed to an NHL team. On 11 February, Thomas Larkin was named Italy's captain, with Luca Frigo, Diego Kostner, Giovanni Morini, and Alex Trivellato named alternate captains.

Head coach: (Finland) Jukka Jalonen

No.	Pos.	Name	Height	Weight	Birthdate	Team
6	D	Jason Seed	1.85 m (6 ft 1 in)	88 kg (194 lb)	27 January 1992 (aged 34)	(Italy) HC Bolzano
7	F	Alessandro Segafredo	1.85 m (6 ft 1 in)	90 kg (198 lb)	15 September 2004 (aged 21)	(Switzerland) GCK Lions
9	F	Daniel Mantenuto	1.78 m (5 ft 10 in)	81 kg (179 lb)	18 October 1997 (aged 28)	(Italy) HC Bolzano
10	F	Dustin Gazley	1.73 m (5 ft 8 in)	76 kg (168 lb)	3 October 1988 (aged 37)	(Italy) HC Bolzano
11	F	Marco Zanetti	1.75 m (5 ft 9 in)	72 kg (159 lb)	12 March 2002 (aged 23)	(Switzerland) HC Lugano
13	F	Matt Bradley	1.83 m (6 ft 0 in)	92 kg (203 lb)	22 January 1997 (aged 29)	(Italy) HC Bolzano
18	F	Nick Saracino	1.83 m (6 ft 0 in)	88 kg (194 lb)	20 February 1992 (aged 33)	(Italy) HC Pustertal Wölfe
19	F	Alex Petan	1.75 m (5 ft 9 in)	82 kg (181 lb)	2 May 1992 (aged 33)	(Slovenia) HK Olimpija
20	G	Damian Clara	2.01 m (6 ft 7 in)	97 kg (214 lb)	13 January 2005 (aged 21)	(Sweden) Brynäs IF
21	D	Daniel Glira	1.85 m (6 ft 1 in)	87 kg (192 lb)	25 March 1994 (aged 31)	(Italy) HC Pustertal Wölfe
22	F	Diego Kostner – A	1.83 m (6 ft 0 in)	86 kg (190 lb)	5 August 1992 (aged 33)	(Switzerland) HC Ambrì-Piotta
23	F	Giovanni Morini – A	1.88 m (6 ft 2 in)	90 kg (198 lb)	2 February 1995 (aged 31)	(Switzerland) HC Lugano
27	D	Thomas Larkin – C	1.96 m (6 ft 5 in)	100 kg (220 lb)	31 December 1990 (aged 35)	(Germany) Schwenninger Wild Wings
34	F	Tommy Purdeller	1.80 m (5 ft 11 in)	88 kg (194 lb)	13 April 2004 (aged 21)	(Italy) HC Pustertal Wölfe
35	G	Davide Fadani	1.83 m (6 ft 0 in)	78 kg (172 lb)	3 February 2001 (aged 25)	(Switzerland) EHC Kloten
36	F	Cristiano DiGiacinto	1.80 m (5 ft 11 in)	88 kg (194 lb)	10 January 1996 (aged 30)	(Italy) HC Bolzano
37	D	Phil Pietroniro	1.85 m (6 ft 1 in)	90 kg (198 lb)	27 May 1994 (aged 31)	(Czech Republic) Rytíři Kladno
53	D	Alex Trivellato – A	1.88 m (6 ft 2 in)	90 kg (198 lb)	5 January 1993 (aged 33)	(Germany) Schwenninger Wild Wings
55	D	Luca Zanatta	1.85 m (6 ft 1 in)	90 kg (198 lb)	15 May 1991 (aged 34)	(Italy) HC Pustertal Wölfe
59	G	Gianluca Vallini	1.85 m (6 ft 1 in)	85 kg (187 lb)	27 October 1993 (aged 32)	(Italy) HC Bolzano
67	F	Mats Frycklund	1.88 m (6 ft 2 in)	95 kg (209 lb)	4 May 1993 (aged 32)	(Italy) HC Pustertal Wölfe
77	D	Gregory di Tomaso	1.85 m (6 ft 1 in)	85 kg (187 lb)	12 March 1996 (aged 29)	(Italy) HC Pustertal Wölfe
88	F	Tommaso de Luca	1.83 m (6 ft 0 in)	85 kg (187 lb)	29 December 2004 (aged 21)	(Switzerland) HC Ambrì-Piotta
90	D	Dylan di Perna	1.88 m (6 ft 2 in)	98 kg (216 lb)	26 April 1996 (aged 29)	(Italy) HC Bolzano
93	F	Luca Frigo – A	1.83 m (6 ft 0 in)	90 kg (198 lb)	30 May 1993 (aged 32)	(Italy) HC Bolzano

=== Slovakia ===
The first six players of Slovakia's roster were announced on 16 June 2025. The remainder of the roster was named on 8 January 2026. On 28 January 2026, Marek Hrivík was ruled out due to injury, and replaced by Lukáš Cingel. On 9 February, Tomáš Tatar was named Slovakia's captain, with Erik Černák and Martin Fehérváry serving as alternate captains.

Head coach: Vladimír Országh

No.	Pos.	Name	Height	Weight	Birthdate	Team
6	F	Lukáš Cingel	1.88 m (6 ft 2 in)	90 kg (198 lb)	10 June 1992 (aged 33)	(Czech Republic) Kometa Brno
8	F	Oliver Okuliar	1.88 m (6 ft 2 in)	86 kg (190 lb)	24 May 2000 (aged 25)	(Sweden) Skellefteå AIK
11	F	Miloš Kelemen	1.85 m (6 ft 1 in)	97 kg (214 lb)	6 July 1999 (aged 26)	(Czech Republic) Dynamo Pardubice
14	D	Peter Čerešňák	1.91 m (6 ft 3 in)	98 kg (216 lb)	26 January 1993 (aged 33)	(Czech Republic) Dynamo Pardubice
15	F	Dalibor Dvorský	1.85 m (6 ft 1 in)	93 kg (205 lb)	15 July 2005 (aged 20)	(United States) St. Louis Blues
17	D	Šimon Nemec	1.83 m (6 ft 0 in)	94 kg (207 lb)	15 February 2004 (aged 21)	(United States) New Jersey Devils
20	F	Juraj Slafkovský	1.93 m (6 ft 4 in)	103 kg (227 lb)	30 March 2004 (aged 21)	(Canada) Montreal Canadiens
21	F	Adam Ružička	1.93 m (6 ft 4 in)	104 kg (229 lb)	11 May 1999 (aged 26)	(Russia) Spartak Moscow
23	F	Adam Liška	1.80 m (5 ft 11 in)	84 kg (185 lb)	14 October 1999 (aged 26)	(Russia) Severstal Cherepovets
28	D	Martin Gernát	1.93 m (6 ft 4 in)	94 kg (207 lb)	11 April 1993 (aged 32)	(Russia) Lokomotiv Yaroslavl
29	D	Michal Ivan	1.85 m (6 ft 1 in)	90 kg (198 lb)	8 November 1999 (aged 26)	(Czech Republic) Bílí Tygři Liberec
30	G	Adam Gajan	1.91 m (6 ft 3 in)	82 kg (181 lb)	6 May 2004 (aged 21)	(United States) Minnesota Duluth Bulldogs
31	G	Samuel Hlavaj	1.93 m (6 ft 4 in)	99 kg (218 lb)	29 May 2001 (aged 24)	(United States) Iowa Wild
33	G	Stanislav Škorvánek	1.88 m (6 ft 2 in)	88 kg (194 lb)	31 January 1996 (aged 30)	(Czech Republic) Mountfield HK
34	F	Peter Cehlárik	1.88 m (6 ft 2 in)	94 kg (207 lb)	2 August 1995 (aged 30)	(Sweden) Leksands IF
42	D	Martin Fehérváry – A	1.88 m (6 ft 2 in)	95 kg (209 lb)	6 October 1999 (aged 26)	(United States) Washington Capitals
49	F	Samuel Takáč	1.83 m (6 ft 0 in)	92 kg (203 lb)	3 December 1991 (aged 34)	(Slovakia) Slovan Bratislava
52	D	Martin Marinčin	1.96 m (6 ft 5 in)	95 kg (209 lb)	18 February 1992 (aged 33)	(Czech Republic) Oceláři Třinec
64	D	Patrik Koch	1.85 m (6 ft 1 in)	86 kg (190 lb)	8 December 1996 (aged 29)	(Czech Republic) Oceláři Třinec
76	F	Martin Pospíšil	1.88 m (6 ft 2 in)	94 kg (207 lb)	19 November 1999 (aged 26)	(Canada) Calgary Flames
79	F	Libor Hudáček	1.78 m (5 ft 10 in)	80 kg (176 lb)	7 September 1990 (aged 35)	(Czech Republic) Oceláři Třinec
81	D	Erik Černák – A	1.93 m (6 ft 4 in)	103 kg (227 lb)	28 May 1997 (aged 28)	(United States) Tampa Bay Lightning
84	F	Pavol Regenda	1.93 m (6 ft 4 in)	102 kg (225 lb)	7 December 1999 (aged 26)	(United States) San Jose Sharks
90	F	Tomáš Tatar – C	1.78 m (5 ft 10 in)	82 kg (181 lb)	1 December 1990 (aged 35)	(Switzerland) EV Zug
91	F	Matúš Sukeľ	1.75 m (5 ft 9 in)	77 kg (170 lb)	23 January 1996 (aged 30)	(Czech Republic) HC Litvínov

=== Sweden ===
The first six players of Sweden's roster were announced on 16 June 2025. The remainder of the roster was named on 2 January 2026. On 27 January, Marcus Johansson and Hampus Lindholm were announced as injury replacements for Leo Carlsson and Jonas Brodin, respectively. On 8 February, Gabriel Landeskog was named Sweden's captain, with Victor Hedman and Erik Karlsson serving as alternate captains.

Head coach: Sam Hallam

No.	Pos.	Name	Height	Weight	Birthdate	Team
3	D	Oliver Ekman-Larsson	1.88 m (6 ft 2 in)	92 kg (203 lb)	17 July 1991 (aged 34)	(Canada) Toronto Maple Leafs
4	D	Rasmus Andersson	1.85 m (6 ft 1 in)	92 kg (203 lb)	27 October 1996 (aged 29)	(United States) Vegas Golden Knights
6	D	Philip Broberg	1.91 m (6 ft 3 in)	92 kg (203 lb)	25 June 2001 (aged 24)	(United States) St. Louis Blues
9	F	Filip Forsberg	1.85 m (6 ft 1 in)	93 kg (205 lb)	13 August 1994 (aged 31)	(United States) Nashville Predators
10	F	Alexander Wennberg	1.88 m (6 ft 2 in)	85 kg (187 lb)	22 September 1994 (aged 31)	(United States) San Jose Sharks
14	F	Joel Eriksson Ek	1.91 m (6 ft 3 in)	95 kg (209 lb)	29 January 1997 (aged 29)	(United States) Minnesota Wild
19	F	Adrian Kempe	1.91 m (6 ft 3 in)	90 kg (198 lb)	13 September 1996 (aged 29)	(United States) Los Angeles Kings
23	F	Lucas Raymond	1.83 m (6 ft 0 in)	85 kg (187 lb)	28 March 2002 (aged 23)	(United States) Detroit Red Wings
25	G	Jacob Markström	1.96 m (6 ft 5 in)	93 kg (205 lb)	31 January 1990 (aged 36)	(United States) New Jersey Devils
26	D	Rasmus Dahlin	1.91 m (6 ft 3 in)	94 kg (207 lb)	13 April 2000 (aged 25)	(United States) Buffalo Sabres
27	D	Hampus Lindholm	1.93 m (6 ft 4 in)	100 kg (220 lb)	20 January 1994 (aged 32)	(United States) Boston Bruins
28	F	Elias Lindholm	1.83 m (6 ft 0 in)	92 kg (203 lb)	2 December 1994 (aged 31)	(United States) Boston Bruins
29	F	Pontus Holmberg	1.83 m (6 ft 0 in)	89 kg (196 lb)	9 March 1999 (aged 26)	(United States) Tampa Bay Lightning
30	G	Jesper Wallstedt	1.91 m (6 ft 3 in)	97 kg (214 lb)	14 November 2002 (aged 23)	(United States) Minnesota Wild
32	G	Filip Gustavsson	1.88 m (6 ft 2 in)	90 kg (198 lb)	7 June 1998 (aged 27)	(United States) Minnesota Wild
40	F	Elias Pettersson	1.88 m (6 ft 2 in)	80 kg (176 lb)	12 November 1998 (aged 27)	(Canada) Vancouver Canucks
42	D	Gustav Forsling	1.83 m (6 ft 0 in)	90 kg (198 lb)	12 June 1996 (aged 29)	(United States) Florida Panthers
63	F	Jesper Bratt	1.78 m (5 ft 10 in)	81 kg (179 lb)	30 July 1998 (aged 27)	(United States) New Jersey Devils
65	D	Erik Karlsson – A	1.80 m (5 ft 11 in)	79 kg (174 lb)	31 May 1990 (aged 35)	(United States) Pittsburgh Penguins
67	F	Rickard Rakell	1.85 m (6 ft 1 in)	92 kg (203 lb)	5 March 1993 (aged 32)	(United States) Pittsburgh Penguins
77	D	Victor Hedman – A	1.98 m (6 ft 6 in)	110 kg (243 lb)	18 December 1990 (aged 35)	(United States) Tampa Bay Lightning
88	F	William Nylander	1.83 m (6 ft 0 in)	86 kg (190 lb)	1 May 1996 (aged 29)	(Canada) Toronto Maple Leafs
90	F	Marcus Johansson	1.85 m (6 ft 1 in)	95 kg (209 lb)	6 October 1990 (aged 35)	(United States) Minnesota Wild
92	F	Gabriel Landeskog – C	1.85 m (6 ft 1 in)	92 kg (203 lb)	23 November 1992 (aged 33)	(United States) Colorado Avalanche
93	F	Mika Zibanejad	1.88 m (6 ft 2 in)	92 kg (203 lb)	18 April 1993 (aged 32)	(United States) New York Rangers

== Group C ==
=== Denmark ===
The first six players of Denmark's roster were announced on 16 June 2025. The remaining roster was named on 7 January 2026. On 8 February, Jonas Røndbjerg was ruled out due to injury, and replaced by Malte Setkov. Jesper Jensen Aabo served as Denmark's captain, with Oliver Lauridsen and Patrick Russell as alternate captains.

Head coach: (Sweden) Mikael Gath

No.	Pos.	Name	Height	Weight	Birthdate	Team
3	D	Malte Setkov	2.03 m (6 ft 8 in)	101 kg (223 lb)	14 January 1999 (aged 27)	(Denmark) Rødovre Mighty Bulls
9	F	Frederik Storm	1.80 m (5 ft 11 in)	86 kg (190 lb)	20 February 1989 (aged 36)	(Germany) Kölner Haie
11	F	Alexander True	1.96 m (6 ft 5 in)	91 kg (201 lb)	17 July 1997 (aged 28)	(Finland) JYP
12	F	Oscar Mølgaard	1.83 m (6 ft 0 in)	80 kg (176 lb)	18 February 2005 (aged 20)	(United States) Coachella Valley Firebirds
15	D	Matias Lassen	1.83 m (6 ft 0 in)	88 kg (194 lb)	15 March 1996 (aged 29)	(Germany) Iserlohn Roosters
17	F	Nicklas Jensen	1.91 m (6 ft 3 in)	98 kg (216 lb)	6 March 1993 (aged 32)	(Switzerland) SC Rapperswil-Jona Lakers
20	F	Lars Eller	1.85 m (6 ft 1 in)	90 kg (198 lb)	8 May 1989 (aged 36)	(Canada) Ottawa Senators
22	D	Markus Lauridsen	1.85 m (6 ft 1 in)	90 kg (198 lb)	28 February 1991 (aged 34)	(Italy) HC Pustertal Wölfe
24	F	Nikolaj Ehlers	1.85 m (6 ft 1 in)	82 kg (181 lb)	14 February 1996 (aged 29)	(United States) Carolina Hurricanes
25	D	Oliver Lauridsen – A	1.98 m (6 ft 6 in)	105 kg (231 lb)	24 March 1989 (aged 36)	(Finland) TPS
27	F	Oliver Bjorkstrand	1.83 m (6 ft 0 in)	79 kg (174 lb)	10 April 1995 (aged 30)	(United States) Tampa Bay Lightning
29	F	Mikkel Aagaard	1.83 m (6 ft 0 in)	86 kg (190 lb)	18 October 1995 (aged 30)	(Sweden) Skellefteå AIK
30	G	Mads Søgaard	2.01 m (6 ft 7 in)	91 kg (201 lb)	13 December 2000 (aged 25)	(Canada) Belleville Senators
31	G	Frederik Andersen	1.93 m (6 ft 4 in)	100 kg (220 lb)	2 October 1989 (aged 36)	(United States) Carolina Hurricanes
38	F	Morten Poulsen	1.85 m (6 ft 1 in)	101 kg (223 lb)	9 September 1988 (aged 37)	(Denmark) Herning Blue Fox
40	D	Anders Koch	1.91 m (6 ft 3 in)	86 kg (190 lb)	2 October 1997 (aged 28)	(Austria) Graz99ers
41	D	Jesper Jensen Aabo – C	1.83 m (6 ft 0 in)	87 kg (192 lb)	30 July 1991 (aged 34)	(Austria) EC KAC
42	D	Phillip Bruggisser	1.83 m (6 ft 0 in)	91 kg (201 lb)	7 August 1991 (aged 34)	(Germany) Fischtown Pinguins
48	D	Nicholas B. Jensen	1.88 m (6 ft 2 in)	102 kg (225 lb)	8 April 1989 (aged 36)	(Germany) Fischtown Pinguins
50	F	Mathias Bau	2.01 m (6 ft 7 in)	108 kg (238 lb)	3 July 1993 (aged 32)	(Denmark) Herning Blue Fox
63	F	Patrick Russell – A	1.85 m (6 ft 1 in)	92 kg (203 lb)	4 January 1993 (aged 33)	(Germany) Kölner Haie
65	F	Christian Wejse	1.85 m (6 ft 1 in)	88 kg (194 lb)	4 December 1998 (aged 27)	(Germany) Fischtown Pinguins
80	G	Frederik Dichow	1.96 m (6 ft 5 in)	94 kg (207 lb)	1 March 2001 (aged 24)	(Sweden) HV71
86	F	Joachim Blichfeld	1.88 m (6 ft 2 in)	92 kg (203 lb)	17 July 1998 (aged 27)	(Finland) Tappara
95	F	Nick Olesen	1.85 m (6 ft 1 in)	84 kg (185 lb)	14 November 1995 (aged 30)	(Czech Republic) Motor České Budějovice

=== Germany ===
The first six players of Germany's roster were announced on 16 June 2025. The remainder of the roster was named on 7 January 2026. On 9 February, Leon Draisaitl was named Germany's captain, with Moritz Seider and Tim Stützle serving as alternate captains.

Head coach: Harold Kreis

No.	Pos.	Name	Height	Weight	Birthdate	Team
6	D	Kai Wissmann	1.93 m (6 ft 4 in)	94 kg (207 lb)	22 October 1996 (aged 29)	(Germany) Eisbären Berlin
8	F	Tobias Rieder	1.80 m (5 ft 11 in)	86 kg (190 lb)	10 January 1993 (aged 33)	(Germany) EHC Red Bull München
9	D	Leon Gawanke	1.85 m (6 ft 1 in)	90 kg (198 lb)	31 May 1999 (aged 26)	(Germany) Adler Mannheim
11	D	Korbinian Geibel	1.83 m (6 ft 0 in)	91 kg (201 lb)	8 July 2002 (aged 23)	(Germany) Eisbären Berlin
18	F	Tim Stützle – A	1.83 m (6 ft 0 in)	87 kg (192 lb)	15 January 2002 (aged 24)	(Canada) Ottawa Senators
19	F	Wojciech Stachowiak	1.85 m (6 ft 1 in)	85 kg (187 lb)	3 July 1999 (aged 26)	(United States) Syracuse Crunch
29	F	Leon Draisaitl – C	1.88 m (6 ft 2 in)	96 kg (212 lb)	27 October 1995 (aged 30)	(Canada) Edmonton Oilers
30	G	Philipp Grubauer	1.85 m (6 ft 1 in)	88 kg (194 lb)	25 November 1991 (aged 34)	(United States) Seattle Kraken
35	G	Mathias Niederberger	1.80 m (5 ft 11 in)	79 kg (174 lb)	3 January 1993 (aged 33)	(Germany) EHC Red Bull München
37	G	Maximilian Franzreb	1.83 m (6 ft 0 in)	90 kg (198 lb)	18 August 1996 (aged 29)	(Germany) Adler Mannheim
38	D	Fabio Wagner	1.85 m (6 ft 1 in)	83 kg (183 lb)	17 September 1995 (aged 30)	(Germany) EHC Red Bull München
40	F	Alexander Ehl	1.75 m (5 ft 9 in)	80 kg (176 lb)	8 November 1999 (aged 26)	(Germany) Adler Mannheim
41	D	Jonas Müller	1.83 m (6 ft 0 in)	92 kg (203 lb)	19 October 1995 (aged 30)	(Germany) Eisbären Berlin
44	F	Josh Samanski	1.91 m (6 ft 3 in)	91 kg (201 lb)	22 March 2002 (aged 23)	(United States) Bakersfield Condors
49	D	Lukas Kälble	1.85 m (6 ft 1 in)	93 kg (205 lb)	13 October 1997 (aged 28)	(Germany) Adler Mannheim
53	D	Moritz Seider – A	1.93 m (6 ft 4 in)	90 kg (198 lb)	6 April 2001 (aged 24)	(United States) Detroit Red Wings
62	F	Parker Tuomie	1.78 m (5 ft 10 in)	84 kg (185 lb)	31 October 1995 (aged 30)	(Germany) Kölner Haie
65	F	Marc Michaelis	1.80 m (5 ft 11 in)	85 kg (187 lb)	31 July 1995 (aged 30)	(Germany) Adler Mannheim
72	F	Dominik Kahun	1.80 m (5 ft 11 in)	79 kg (174 lb)	2 July 1995 (aged 30)	(Switzerland) Lausanne HC
73	F	Lukas Reichel	1.83 m (6 ft 0 in)	85 kg (187 lb)	17 May 2002 (aged 23)	(Canada) Abbotsford Canucks
74	F	Justin Schütz	1.80 m (5 ft 11 in)	86 kg (190 lb)	24 June 2000 (aged 25)	(Germany) Adler Mannheim
77	F	JJ Peterka	1.80 m (5 ft 11 in)	85 kg (187 lb)	14 January 2002 (aged 24)	(United States) Utah Mammoth
78	F	Nico Sturm	1.91 m (6 ft 3 in)	94 kg (207 lb)	3 May 1995 (aged 30)	(United States) Minnesota Wild
91	D	Moritz Müller	1.88 m (6 ft 2 in)	92 kg (203 lb)	19 November 1986 (aged 39)	(Germany) Kölner Haie
95	F	Frederik Tiffels	1.83 m (6 ft 0 in)	92 kg (203 lb)	20 May 1995 (aged 30)	(Germany) Eisbären Berlin

=== Latvia ===
The first six players of Latvia's roster were announced on 16 June 2025. The remaining roster was named on 6 January 2026. On 12 January, forward Eriks Mateiko was ruled out for the remainder of the season and Olympics after his Achilles tendon was accidentally cut by a skate blade during a Hershey Bears game; he was replaced on the roster by Anrī Ravinskis. On 18 January, forward Rodrigo Ābols was ruled out after suffering a lower-body injury the previous day, and was replaced by Rihards Bukarts. On 10 February, Kaspars Daugaviņš was named Latvia's captain, with Uvis Balinskis and Zemgus Girgensons serving as alternate captains.

Head coach: Harijs Vītoliņš

No.	Pos.	Name	Height	Weight	Birthdate	Team
3	D	Alberts Šmits	1.93 m (6 ft 4 in)	93 kg (205 lb)	2 December 2007 (aged 18)	(Finland) Jukurit
9	F	Renārs Krastenbergs	1.83 m (6 ft 0 in)	87 kg (192 lb)	26 December 1998 (aged 27)	(Czech Republic) HC Olomouc
11	F	Dans Ločmelis	1.85 m (6 ft 1 in)	81 kg (179 lb)	21 January 2004 (aged 22)	(United States) Providence Bruins
13	F	Rihards Bukarts	1.80 m (5 ft 11 in)	84 kg (185 lb)	31 December 1995 (aged 30)	(Slovakia) HC Prešov
16	F	Kaspars Daugaviņš – C	1.83 m (6 ft 0 in)	102 kg (225 lb)	18 May 1988 (aged 37)	(Germany) Kassel Huskies
17	F	Mārtiņš Dzierkals	1.83 m (6 ft 0 in)	91 kg (201 lb)	4 April 1997 (aged 28)	(Czech Republic) Sparta Praha
21	F	Rūdolfs Balcers	1.80 m (5 ft 11 in)	80 kg (176 lb)	8 April 1997 (aged 28)	(Switzerland) ZSC Lions
22	F	Sandis Vilmanis	1.85 m (6 ft 1 in)	88 kg (194 lb)	23 January 2004 (aged 22)	(United States) Florida Panthers
23	F	Teodors Bļugers	1.85 m (6 ft 1 in)	86 kg (190 lb)	15 August 1994 (aged 31)	(Canada) Vancouver Canucks
26	D	Uvis Balinskis – A	1.85 m (6 ft 1 in)	90 kg (198 lb)	1 August 1996 (aged 29)	(United States) Florida Panthers
27	D	Oskars Cibuļskis	1.88 m (6 ft 2 in)	94 kg (207 lb)	9 April 1988 (aged 37)	(Denmark) Herning Blue Fox
28	F	Zemgus Girgensons – A	1.88 m (6 ft 2 in)	90 kg (198 lb)	5 January 1994 (aged 32)	(United States) Tampa Bay Lightning
29	D	Ralfs Freibergs	1.83 m (6 ft 0 in)	88 kg (194 lb)	17 May 1991 (aged 34)	(Czech Republic) Vítkovice Ridera
30	G	Elvis Merzļikins	1.91 m (6 ft 3 in)	90 kg (198 lb)	13 April 1994 (aged 31)	(United States) Columbus Blue Jackets
31	G	Artūrs Šilovs	1.93 m (6 ft 4 in)	93 kg (205 lb)	22 March 2001 (aged 24)	(United States) Pittsburgh Penguins
34	F	Eduards Tralmaks	1.93 m (6 ft 4 in)	100 kg (220 lb)	17 February 1997 (aged 28)	(United States) Grand Rapids Griffins
43	F	Anrī Ravinskis	1.93 m (6 ft 4 in)	94 kg (207 lb)	2 January 2003 (aged 23)	(Canada) Abbotsford Canucks
50	G	Kristers Gudļevskis	1.93 m (6 ft 4 in)	97 kg (214 lb)	31 July 1992 (aged 33)	(Germany) Fischtown Pinguins
55	D	Roberts Mamčics	1.98 m (6 ft 6 in)	104 kg (229 lb)	6 April 1995 (aged 30)	(Czech Republic) Energie Karlovy Vary
71	F	Roberts Bukarts	1.83 m (6 ft 0 in)	84 kg (185 lb)	27 June 1990 (aged 35)	(Slovakia) Dukla Trenčín
72	D	Jānis Jaks	1.83 m (6 ft 0 in)	89 kg (196 lb)	22 August 1995 (aged 30)	(Czech Republic) Energie Karlovy Vary
77	D	Kristaps Zīle	1.85 m (6 ft 1 in)	90 kg (198 lb)	24 December 1997 (aged 28)	(Czech Republic) Bílí Tygři Liberec
94	D	Kristiāns Rubīns	1.93 m (6 ft 4 in)	99 kg (218 lb)	11 December 1997 (aged 28)	(Czech Republic) Škoda Plzeň
95	F	Oskars Batņa	1.96 m (6 ft 5 in)	106 kg (234 lb)	7 May 1995 (aged 30)	(Finland) Pelicans
97	F	Haralds Egle	1.80 m (5 ft 11 in)	86 kg (190 lb)	11 May 1996 (aged 29)	(Czech Republic) Energie Karlovy Vary

=== United States ===
The first six players of the United States' roster were announced on 16 June 2025. The remainder of the roster was revealed on 2 January 2026. On 21 January, defenseman Seth Jones was ruled out due to injury, and was replaced by Jackson LaCombe. On 8 February, Auston Matthews was named captain, with Charlie McAvoy and Matthew Tkachuk serving as alternate captains.

Head coach: Mike Sullivan

No.	Pos.	Name	Height	Weight	Birthdate	Team
1	G	Jeremy Swayman	1.91 m (6 ft 3 in)	88 kg (194 lb)	24 November 1998 (aged 27)	(United States) Boston Bruins
2	D	Jackson LaCombe	1.88 m (6 ft 2 in)	93 kg (205 lb)	9 January 2001 (aged 25)	(United States) Anaheim Ducks
7	F	Brady Tkachuk	1.93 m (6 ft 4 in)	102 kg (225 lb)	16 September 1999 (aged 26)	(Canada) Ottawa Senators
8	D	Zach Werenski	1.88 m (6 ft 2 in)	98 kg (216 lb)	19 July 1997 (aged 28)	(United States) Columbus Blue Jackets
9	F	Jack Eichel	1.88 m (6 ft 2 in)	94 kg (207 lb)	28 October 1996 (aged 29)	(United States) Vegas Golden Knights
10	F	J. T. Miller	1.85 m (6 ft 1 in)	95 kg (209 lb)	14 March 1993 (aged 32)	(United States) New York Rangers
12	F	Matt Boldy	1.88 m (6 ft 2 in)	91 kg (201 lb)	5 April 2001 (aged 24)	(United States) Minnesota Wild
14	D	Brock Faber	1.85 m (6 ft 1 in)	91 kg (201 lb)	22 August 2002 (aged 23)	(United States) Minnesota Wild
15	D	Noah Hanifin	1.91 m (6 ft 3 in)	93 kg (205 lb)	25 January 1997 (aged 29)	(United States) Vegas Golden Knights
16	F	Vincent Trocheck	1.80 m (5 ft 11 in)	85 kg (187 lb)	11 July 1993 (aged 32)	(United States) New York Rangers
19	F	Matthew Tkachuk – A	1.88 m (6 ft 2 in)	91 kg (201 lb)	11 December 1997 (aged 28)	(United States) Florida Panthers
21	F	Dylan Larkin	1.85 m (6 ft 1 in)	93 kg (205 lb)	30 July 1996 (aged 29)	(United States) Detroit Red Wings
25	D	Charlie McAvoy – A	1.85 m (6 ft 1 in)	95 kg (209 lb)	21 December 1997 (aged 28)	(United States) Boston Bruins
29	F	Brock Nelson	1.93 m (6 ft 4 in)	93 kg (205 lb)	15 October 1991 (aged 34)	(United States) Colorado Avalanche
30	G	Jake Oettinger	1.98 m (6 ft 6 in)	102 kg (225 lb)	18 December 1998 (aged 27)	(United States) Dallas Stars
34	F	Auston Matthews – C	1.91 m (6 ft 3 in)	98 kg (216 lb)	17 September 1997 (aged 28)	(Canada) Toronto Maple Leafs
37	G	Connor Hellebuyck	1.93 m (6 ft 4 in)	94 kg (207 lb)	19 May 1993 (aged 32)	(Canada) Winnipeg Jets
43	D	Quinn Hughes	1.78 m (5 ft 10 in)	82 kg (181 lb)	14 October 1999 (aged 26)	(United States) Minnesota Wild
59	F	Jake Guentzel	1.80 m (5 ft 11 in)	82 kg (181 lb)	6 October 1994 (aged 31)	(United States) Tampa Bay Lightning
72	F	Tage Thompson	1.98 m (6 ft 6 in)	100 kg (220 lb)	30 October 1997 (aged 28)	(United States) Buffalo Sabres
74	D	Jaccob Slavin	1.91 m (6 ft 3 in)	94 kg (207 lb)	1 May 1994 (aged 31)	(United States) Carolina Hurricanes
81	F	Kyle Connor	1.85 m (6 ft 1 in)	83 kg (183 lb)	9 December 1996 (aged 29)	(Canada) Winnipeg Jets
85	D	Jake Sanderson	1.88 m (6 ft 2 in)	92 kg (203 lb)	8 July 2002 (aged 23)	(Canada) Ottawa Senators
86	F	Jack Hughes	1.80 m (5 ft 11 in)	80 kg (176 lb)	14 May 2001 (aged 24)	(United States) New Jersey Devils
91	F	Clayton Keller	1.78 m (5 ft 10 in)	79 kg (174 lb)	29 July 1998 (aged 27)	(United States) Utah Mammoth
