= John Samanski =

Canadian ice hockey player

- Born: June 30, 1962 (age 63) Oshawa, Ontario, Canada
- Height: 6 ft 0 in (183 cm)
- Weight: 181 lb (82 kg; 12 st 13 lb)
- Position: Centre
- Shot: Left
- Played for: Bowling Green; Kalamazoo Wings; Augsburger Panther; HC Brunico; Kölner Haie
- National team: Canada
- Playing career: 1980–2001

John Samanski is a Canadian ice hockey former player and coach. He won a national championship with Bowling Green before embarking on a long career, mostly with minor league German teams.

== Career ==
Samanski played junior hockey in his home town and managed to play one game for the Oshawa Generals in 1980. Because the single appearance didn't cost him his collegiate eligibility, Samanski was able to join Bowling Green the following season and quickly became one of its top offensive producers. After averaging a point per game as a freshman, an injury cost Samanski most of his sophomore year. Once he returned he looked like he hadn't lost a step and averaged almost 2 points per game as a junior. He saves his best for last and, though his scoring dipped slightly in his 4th year, Samanski helped BGSU win the national championship. His final point was an iconic goal that occurred when Samanski beat three opposing players to a loose puck and poked it into the net for a game-tying goal with less than 2 minutes to play.

After graduating, Samanski played briefly for Team Canada and the Kalamazoo Wings but wound up in Germany to continue his professional career. He joined the Augsburger EV at the end of their season and immediately started scoring for the team. Despite averaging exactly 2 points per game in 16 playoff contests, he was not retained by the club but his scoring exploits attracted the attention of EV Stuttgart who signed him the following season. After averaging more than 4 points per game in the 3rd German league in 1986, Samanski exploded for 166 points in just 28 games the following year (nearly 6 points per game). Samanski finished 3rd in the league and helped Stuttgart win promotion to the 2nd Bundesliga With tougher competition, Samanski's scoring decreased but he was still able to average more than 3 points per game and make a deep run in the playoffs.

In 1988, Samanski travelled south and played one season for HC Brunico. He led the team in scoring with a more than 2 point per game average but the club failed to make the postseason. Samanski returned to Augsburger the following season and saw his offensive output decline significantly. He was back with Stuttgart the following year and, though his output remained low, he made a brief appearance with Kölner Haie during the year. After the season, Stuttgart folded due to bankruptcy and Samanski was forced to find a new team. He had to return to the Oberliga and signed a contract with TSV Erding. Samanski swiftly rediscovered his scoring touch and scored 100 points in three of the next four seasons. He remained with the club for seven seasons and, though he didn't help them earn a promotion, the restructuring of the national tiers in 1994 saw Samanski's return to the 2nd German league.

By the late 90's, Samanski was beginning to slow down. He played two seasons with both EV Regensburg and EHC Bad Aibling, now reclassified to the 3rd tier, before retiring after the 2001 season.

After a few years away, Samanski returned to the German minor leagues as a coach in 2003. He made his first appearance with his old club, TSV Erding, which by them had been relegated to the 5th German league. After getting them a promotion for the following year, he was brought in by TEV Miesbach and twice saved the club from relegation. He was then hired by EHC Klostersee but, after missing the postseason for two years, was relieved of his coaching duties in November in 2008. Samanski sat out for most of the next three years but eventually returned to coaching with ESC Dorfen of the Regionalliga. Two years later he returned to the Oberliga with the Erding Gladiators before landing with his old club, Miesbach, in 2015. His second stint didn't last long and he was released in December. After a year with SE Freising he was back behind the bench for Dorfen but released from his position a year and a half later.

== Career statistics ==
=== Regular season and playoffs ===
			Regular Season					Playoffs
Season	Team	League	GP	G	A	Pts	PIM	GP	G	A	Pts	PIM
1979–80	Oshawa Legionaires	MetJBHL	42	45	49	94	4	—	—	—	—	—
1979–80	Oshawa Generals	OMJHL	1	0	0	0	0	—	—	—	—	—
1980–81	Bowling Green	CCHA	39	17	22	39	12	—	—	—	—	—
1981–82	Bowling Green	CCHA	13	5	4	9	19	—	—	—	—	—
1982–83	Bowling Green	CCHA	30	27	30	57	48	—	—	—	—	—
1983–84	Bowling Green	CCHA	42	25	35	60	52	—	—	—	—	—
1984–85	Team Canada	International	4	1	1	2	0	—	—	—	—	—
1984–85	Kalamazoo Wings	IHL	9	2	2	4	0	—	—	—	—	—
1984–85	Augsburger EV	Germany 2	3	7	2	9	2	16	16	16	32	20
1985–86	EV Stuttgart	Germany 3	13	21	35	56	2	—	—	—	—	—
1986–87	EV Stuttgart	Germany 3	28	74	92	166	20	14	29	38	67	8
1987–88	EV Stuttgart	Germany 2	36	50	69	119	26	12	11	24	35	4
1988–89	HC Brunico	Italy	42	49	41	90	10	—	—	—	—	—
1989–90	Augsburger EV	Germany 2	21	24	15	39	10	4	5	3	8	2
1990–91	EV Stuttgart	Germany 2	21	17	22	39	12	—	—	—	—	—
1990–91	Kölner Haie	Germany	4	0	1	1	0	11	1	2	3	2
1991–92	TSV Erding	Germany 3	29	46	54	100	46	13	15	15	30	15
1992–93	TSV Erding	Germany 3	34	57	50	107	18	14	17	19	36	8
1993–94	TSV Erding	Germany 3	25	18	15	33	32	—	—	—	—	—
1994–95	TSV Erding	Germany 2	43	49	51	100	20	9	6	12	18	2
1995–96	TSV Erding	Germany 2	48	37	43	80	16	—	—	—	—	—
1996–97	TSV Erding	Germany 2	50	30	59	89	30	12	6	8	14	10
1997–98	EV Regensburg	Germany 3	42	50	48	98	16	6	2	5	7	2
1998–99	EV Regensburg	Germany 3	35	17	21	38	24	11	4	6	10	2
1999–00	HC Bad Aibling	Germany 3	36	24	34	58	26	—	—	—	—	—
2000–01	HC Bad Aibling	Germany 3	38	4	12	16	10	—	—	—	—	—
NCAA Totals			124	74	91	165	131	—	—	—	—	—
Germany Totals			4	0	1	1	0	11	1	2	3	2
Germany 2 Totals			222	214	261	475	116	53	44	63	107	38
Germany 3 Totals			280	311	361	672	194	58	67	83	150	35
Serie A Totals			42	49	41	90	10	—	—	—	—	—

== Personal life ==
Samanski’s father Walter played hockey in the International Hockey League. His children are all involved in sports on some level: Patrik (born 1995) now retired, played hockey for ESV Gebensbach, Neal (born 1998) and Noah (born 2005) for the Blue Devils Weiden in Germany, and Joshua (born 2002) for the Edmonton Oilers. His son Tim plays basketball for the Fulda Red Knites, his daughter Lilly (born 2005) is a pole vaulter, and Lucy is a dressage rider.
