= Diego Scandella =

HC Ambri-Piotta Ice Hockey Coach

Diego Scandella (born May 7, 1964, in Montreal, Quebec) is a Canadian-Italian professional ice hockey coach. He is currently serving as assistant coach of Swiss NLA team HC Ambrì-Piotta.

== Career ==
A Canadian of Italian descent, Scandella came to Italy in 1988, where he played professionally for HC Bergamo. Following his playing career, he turned to coaching. He moved from Bergamo to Milan in 1991, where he served as assistant coach of the Devils Milano and contributed to winning the 1992 and 1993 Italian championship.

From 1998 to 2000, he was head coach of another Italian Serie A team, HC Bruneck, before heading to Switzerland to join the coaching staff of National League A (NLA) side HC Lugano as an assistant, while also working in the youth ranks. During his almost seven years at Lugano, the team won two national championships (2003 and 2006).

Scandella moved to HC Ambrì-Piotta in 2008, taking over the assistant coach position, and in October 2016 joined the coaching staff of the club's youth ranks.

== National team coaching ==
Scandella has worked as a video manager for Team Canada on several occasions, including the 2007 and 2012 Spengler Cup. He also served on the coaching staff of the Swiss national team during the 2010 World Championship and served as assistant coach and head coach of the Hungarian national team.
