= Alexander Gschliesser =

Italian ice hockey player and coach

- Born: 11 May 1973 (age 51); Sterzing, Italy
- Height: 5 ft 11 in (180 cm)
- Weight: 185 lb (84 kg; 13 st 3 lb)
- Position: Right wing
- Shot: Right
- Played for: Serie A HC Fassa; Brunico SG; AC Milan Hockey; WSV Sterzing Broncos; HC Merano; HC Pustertal
- National team: Italy
- NHL draft: Undrafted
- Playing career: 1990–2008

Alexander Gschliesser (born 11 May 1973) is an Italian former professional ice hockey player. He has been an assistant coach with the Italian WSV Sterzing Broncos since 2010.

== International ==
Gschliesser competed for Italy in the 1994 Winter Olympics. He also competed for Italy at the 1998 IIHF World Championship.
