= Josh Samanski =

German ice hockey player (born 2002)

- Born: March 22, 2002 (age 24) Erding, Germany
- Height: 6 ft 2 in (188 cm)
- Weight: 198 lb (90 kg; 14 st 2 lb)
- Position: Forward
- Shoots: Left
- NHL team Former teams: Edmonton Oilers; Straubing Tigers
- National team: Germany
- NHL draft: Undrafted
- Playing career: 2020–present

Joshua Samanski (born March 22, 2002) is a German professional ice hockey player who is a forward for the Edmonton Oilers of the National Hockey League (NHL). He has previously played in the Deutsche Eishockey Liga (DEL) with the Straubing Tigers.

== Early life ==
Samanski was born on March 22, 2002 in Erding, Germany. He also holds Canadian citizenship through his father, John, who himself is a former professional hockey player. He has six siblings, all of whom are involved in sports.

== Playing career ==
=== Junior ===
Growing up, Samanski played with Jungadler Mannheim, a team in the Schüler-BL. His best season with them saw him record 106 points in 36 games. He spent one season in the Ontario Hockey League (OHL), playing with the Owen Sound Attack.

=== Professional ===
Samanski joined the Straubing Tigers of the Deutsche Eishockey Liga (DEL) in the 2021–22 season. He was named alternate captain of the club for the 2024–25 season.

On April 2, 2025, Samanski was signed by the Edmonton Oilers to a two-year, $1,950,000 contract.

He played his first game in the NHL on January 26, 2026. Samanski recorded his first NHL point, an assist, in his third game, a 7–3 loss to the Minnesota Wild. After five games with the Oilers, in which Samanski recorded two assists, he was sent down to the Bakersfield Condors, the American Hockey League (AHL) affiliate of the Oilers. After the Olympic break, Samanski would be called back up to the Oilers, where he would remain for the rest of the season. He was credited with his first NHL goal during a March 21 game against the Tampa Bay Lightning after a pass from Oliver Bjorkstrand to Emil Lilleberg deflected past Andrei Vasilevskiy.

Samanski made his Stanley Cup Playoffs debut on April 22, 2026, against the Anaheim Ducks, in which he recorded one goal in a 6-4 loss. The Oilers would end up losing to the Anaheim Ducks in the first round of the 2026 Playoffs, 4-2.

== International play ==
Samanski has represented Germany internationally. He played for the German junior team in the World Junior Championships in 2021 and 2022, serving as an alternate captain in the latter tournament.

Samanski played for Germany at the 2025 IIHF World Championships. He was also named to the national roster for the 2026 Winter Olympics. During the Olympics, Samanski recorded a goal and an assist in five games.

On May 6, 2026, Samanski was added to Team Germany's roster for the 2026 Men's Ice Hockey World Championships.

== Career statistics ==
=== Regular season and playoffs ===
			Regular season					Playoffs
Season	Team	League	GP	G	A	Pts	PIM	GP	G	A	Pts	PIM
2018–19	Brantford 99ers	OJHL	54	13	12	35	32	—	—	—	—	—
2019–20	Owen Sound Attack	OHL	54	4	16	20	20	—	—	—	—	—
2020–21	Ravensburg Towerstars	DEL2	41	4	18	22	18	7	5	5	10	0
2021–22	Straubing Tigers	DEL	42	7	1	8	14	4	0	0	0	0
2021–22	EV Landshut	DEL2	7	2	2	4	0	—	—	—	—	—
2022–23	Straubing Tigers	DEL	48	9	9	18	23	7	1	0	1	2
2023–24	Straubing Tigers	DEL	51	10	17	27	36	12	2	4	6	18
2024–25	Straubing Tigers	DEL	52	14	26	40	29	7	2	2	4	2
2025–26	Bakersfield Condors	AHL	45	8	23	31	40	—	—	—	—	—
2025–26	Edmonton Oilers	NHL	24	2	2	4	6	5	1	1	2	4
2026–27	Edmonton Oilers	NHL	6	0	1	1	8	—	—	—	—	—
DEL totals			183	40	53	93	102	30	5	6	11	22
NHL totals			30	2	3	5	14	5	1	1	2	4

=== International ===
Year	Team	Event	Result	GP	G	A	Pts	PIM
2021	Germany	WJC	6th	2	0	0	0	0
2022	Germany	WJC	6th	4	1	2	3	0
2025	Germany	WC	9th	7	2	3	5	6
2026	Germany	OG	6th	5	1	1	2	2
2026	Germany	WC	10th	7	2	5	7	0
Junior totals				6	1	2	3	0
Senior totals				19	5	9	14	8
