= Daniel Glira =

Italian ice hockey player (born 1994)

- Born: 25 March 1994 (age 32) Innichen, Italy
- Height: 6 ft 2 in (188 cm)
- Weight: 192 lb (87 kg; 13 st 10 lb)
- Position: Defence
- Shoots: Left
- ICEHL team Former teams: HC Pustertal Wölfe; SV Kaltern; HC Merano; HC Bolzano
- National team: Italy
- Playing career: 2010–present

Daniel Glira (born 25 March 1994) is an Italian professional ice hockey player who is a defenceman for HC Pustertal Wölfe of the ICE Hockey League (ICEHL).

== International play ==
Glira represented the Italy national team at the 2026 Winter Olympics. and the 2017, 2021 and 2022 IIHF World Championship.
