= Patrick Bona =

Italian ice hockey player

- Born: February 14, 1981 (age 44) Bolzano, Italy
- Height: 5 ft 9 in (175 cm)
- Weight: 187 lb (85 kg; 13 st 5 lb)
- Position: Right wing
- Shoots: Right
- Italy-2 team Former teams: HC Falcons Brixen-Bressanone; HC Pustertal Wölfe; HC Merano; WSV Sterzing Broncos; Brest Albatros Hockey; Ritten Sport
- National team: Italy
- NHL draft: Undrafted
- Playing career: 1997–present

Patrick Bona (born February 14, 1981) is an Italian ice hockey player. He is currently playing with the HC Falcons Brixen-Bressanone of the Italian Hockey League.

== International ==
Bona was named to the Italy national ice hockey team for competition at the 2014 IIHF World Championship.
