= Nikita Osipov =

Belarusian ice hockey player

- Born: April 22, 1984 (age 41) Samara, Russia
- Height: 6 ft 0 in (183 cm)
- Weight: 172 lb (78 kg; 12 st 4 lb)
- Position: Forward
- Shoots: Left
- KHL team Former teams: HC Dinamo Minsk; HC Sibir Novosibirsk
- National team: Belarus
- NHL draft: Undrafted
- Playing career: 2002–present

Nikita Osipov (born April 22, 1984) is a Belarusian ice hockey player. He is currently playing with the HC Dinamo Minsk of the Kontinental Hockey League (KHL).

Osipov played in the KHL with HC Sibir Novosibirsk during the 2012–13 season.

== International ==
Osipov was named to the Belarus men's national ice hockey team for competition at the 2014 IIHF World Championship.

== Career statistics ==
			Regular season					Playoffs
Season	Team	League	GP	G	A	Pts	PIM	GP	G	A	Pts	PIM
2001–02	HC Dynamo Moscow-2	Russia3	32	10	22	32	24	—	—	—	—	—
2002–03	HC Dynamo Moscow-2	Russia3	14	12	9	21	8	—	—	—	—	—
2002–03	CSK VVS Samara	Russia2	28	5	4	9	12	—	—	—	—	—
2003–04	CSK VVS Samara	Russia2	56	7	12	19	46	—	—	—	—	—
2003–04	CSK VVS Samara-2	Russia3	3	1	0	1	0	—	—	—	—	—
2004–05	CSK VVS Samara	Russia2	49	8	9	17	72	—	—	—	—	—
2005–06	Motor Barnaul	Russia2	27	1	8	9	12	—	—	—	—	—
2005–06	Motor Barnaul-2	Russia3	2	0	2	2	2	—	—	—	—	—
2005–06	HK MVD	Russia	9	2	0	2	6	4	1	1	2	2
2005–06	HK MVD-THK Tver	Russia3	10	2	6	8	4	—	—	—	—	—
2006–07	HC Dinamo Minsk	Belarus	28	3	5	8	16	12	0	3	3	16
2006–07	HC Dinamo Minsk-2	Belarus2	17	13	12	25	24	—	—	—	—	—
2007–08	HC Dinamo Minsk	Belarus	53	14	18	32	32	8	0	4	4	4
2008–09	Metallurg Zhlobin	Belarus	45	7	25	32	20	7	0	3	3	0
2002–03]]	Metallurg Zhlobin-2	Belarus2	1	2	0	2	0	—	—	—	—	—
2009–10	Metallurg Zhlobin	Belarus	46	5	12	17	24	—	—	—	—	—
2009–10	Metallurg Zhlobin-2	Belarus2	4	3	6	9	4	—	—	—	—	—
2010–11	Metallurg Zhlobin	Belarus	47	8	32	40	32	6	2	5	7	4
2011–12	Metallurg Zhlobin	Belarus	42	13	36	49	30	14	2	10	12	4
2012–13	Sibir Novosibirsk	KHL	14	1	0	1	2	—	—	—	—	—
2012–13	Metallurg Zhlobin	Belarus	28	6	20	26	16	11	6	5	11	4
2013–14	Metallurg Zhlobin	Belarus	41	13	19	32	14	7	3	4	7	12
2013–14	HC Dinamo Minsk	KHL	11	0	0	0	4	—	—	—	—	—
2014–15	Toros Neftekamsk	VHL	4	0	0	0	0	—	—	—	—	—
2014–15	Metallurg Zhlobin	Belarus	39	3	22	25	16	4	0	0	0	0
2015–16	Metallurg Zhlobin	Belarus	36	3	19	22	12	6	1	2	3	2
2016–17	HC Neman Grodno	Belarus	2	0	0	0	0	—	—	—	—	—
2016–17	Metallurg Zhlobin	Belarus	18	4	7	11	2	4	1	1	2	0
2017–18	Metallurg Zhlobin	Belarus	31	6	20	26	22	4	3	1	4	2
2017–18	Metallurg Zhlobin-2	Belarus2	2	1	3	4	0	—	—	—	—	—
Belarus totals			456	85	235	320	236	83	18	38	56	48
