= Greg DiTomaso =

Italian ice hockey player (born 1996)

- Born: March 12, 1996 (age 30) Toronto, Ontario, Canada
- Height: 6 ft 1 in (185 cm)
- Weight: 187 lb (85 kg; 13 st 5 lb)
- Position: Defenceman
- Shoots: Right
- ICEHL team: HC Pustertal Wölfe
- Played for: South Carolina Stingrays; SG Cortina
- National team: Italy
- NHL draft: Undrafted
- Playing career: 2021–present

Gregory DiTomaso (born March 12, 1996) is a Canadian-born Italian professional ice hockey defenceman who plays for HC Pustertal Wölfe of the ICE Hockey League (ICEHL) and the Italian national team. He represented Italy in the men's ice hockey tournament at the 2026 Winter Olympics. DiTomaso previously played for SG Cortina, with whom he won the Italian championship in 2023 and 2025.

== Playing career ==
=== Junior and university ===
DiTomaso was born in Toronto and raised in Etobicoke. He played three seasons in the Ontario Hockey League (OHL), appearing for the Mississauga Steelheads, Saginaw Spirit and Barrie Colts. He recorded 54 points in 187 regular-season OHL games. After a brief stint with the Gatineau Olympiques of the Quebec Major Junior Hockey League, he joined the St. Catharines Falcons of the Greater Ontario Junior Hockey League for the 2016–17 season. He led the league's defencemen in scoring with 72 points in 35 games.

DiTomaso joined the Ryerson Rams men's ice hockey team in 2017. He was selected for the Ontario University Athletics West Division All-Rookie Team following his first season. During the 2019–20 season, he led all OUA defencemen with 26 points, recording six goals and 20 assists in 28 games. He was subsequently named the OUA West Defenceman of the Year and a West Division First-Team All-Star.

DiTomaso received a Bachelor of Commerce degree from Ryerson in 2021 and an MBA from the university's Ted Rogers School of Management in 2022.

=== Professional ===
DiTomaso began his professional career during the 2021–22 season. He appeared in 25 games for the South Carolina Stingrays of the ECHL, recording two goals and seven assists.

In 2022, he moved to Italy and joined SG Cortina of the Alps Hockey League. During his first season with the club, Cortina won the 2022–23 Italian championship, its first national title since 2007. Cortina won another Italian championship in January 2025, defeating Ritten Sport in the championship series.

After three seasons with Cortina, DiTomaso signed with HC Pustertal of the ICE Hockey League in May 2025.

== International play ==
DiTomaso is eligible to represent Italy through his Italian ancestry. After being contacted about the possibility of joining the Italian national program, he moved to Italy in 2022 and completed the citizenship and residency requirements necessary to represent the country in international competition.

He made his senior national-team debut in December 2023 during the Austrian Cup. DiTomaso later represented Italy at the 2025 IIHF World Championship Division I Group A tournament, recording one goal and two assists in five games. Italy finished second and earned promotion to the top division of the IIHF World Championship.

DiTomaso was selected for Italy's team at the 2026 Winter Olympics, where he made his Olympic debut against Sweden on February 11. He played in all four of Italy's games as the host nation finished 12th.

== Awards and honours ==
Club

- Italian champion with SG Cortina: 2022–23, 2024–25

Individual

- OUA West All-Rookie Team: 2017–18
- OUA West Defenceman of the Year: 2019–20
- OUA West First-Team All-Star: 2019–20
