= Ari Moisanen =

Finnish ice hockey player and coach

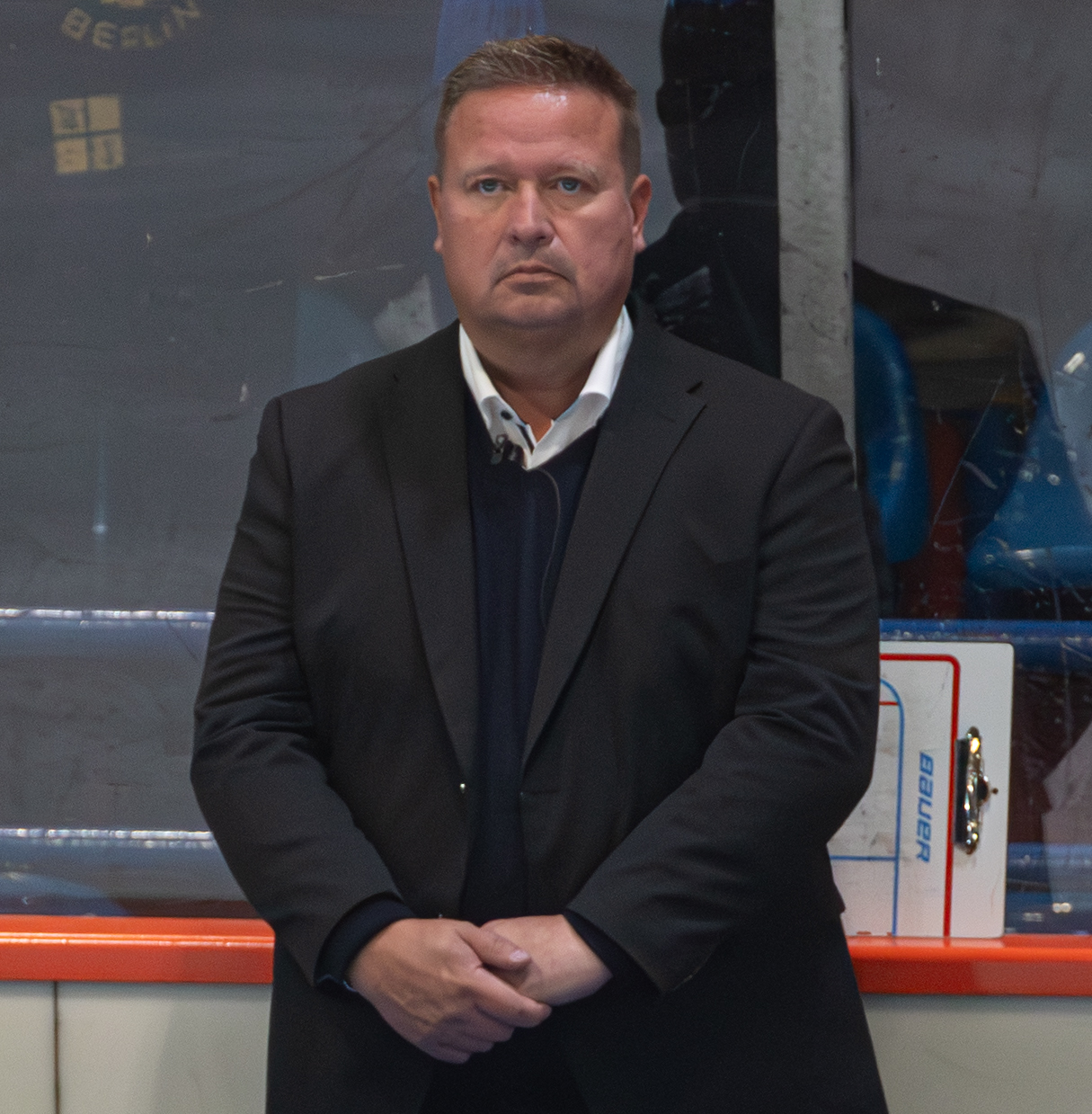
- Moisanen in 2025
- Born: September 7, 1971 (age 54) Rauma, Finland
- Height: 5 ft 9 in (175 cm)
- Weight: 154 lb (70 kg; 11 st 0 lb)
- Position: Goaltender
- Caught: Left
- Played for: SM-liiga; Lukko
- NHL draft: Undrafted
- Playing career: 1990–1994

Ari Moisanen (born September 7, 1971) is a Finnish former professional ice hockey goaltender. He is currently a goaltender coach with Tps turku in liiga.

Moisanen served as goaltender coach for the Finland men's national ice hockey team at the 2014 Winter Olympics, and the 2013 and 2014 IIHF World Championships.and he was a goaltender coach for finland national team from 2013-2016
