= Nick Saracino =

Italian-American ice hockey player (born 1992)

- Born: 20 February 1992 (age 34) St. Louis, Missouri, U.S.
- Height: 6 ft 0 in (183 cm)
- Weight: 194 lb (88 kg; 13 st 12 lb)
- Position: Forward
- Shoots: Left
- ICEHL team Former teams: HC Pustertal; Iowa Wild; Binghamton Devils; HKM Zvolen; Asiago; HC Bolzano
- National team: Italy
- NHL draft: Undrafted
- Playing career: 2016–present

Nicholas Samuel Saracino (born 20 February 1992) is an Italian-American professional ice hockey player who is a forward for HC Pustertal Wölfe in the ICE Hockey League (ICEHL).

== Early life ==
Saracino attended Christian Brothers College High School, graduating in 2010.

== Playing career ==
Saracino played college hockey for the Providence Friars from 2012 to 2016.

He played for the Worcester Railers of the ECHL in the 2017–18 season. On 26 June 2018, he was traded to the Wheeling Nailers.

He signed with HC Pustertal Wölfe on 19 May 2025.

== International play ==
Saracino represented the Italy national team at the 2026 Winter Olympics.

== Personal life ==
Saracino is of Italian descent.

== Career statistics ==
=== Regular season and playoffs ===
			Regular season					Playoffs
Season	Team	League	GP	G	A	Pts	PIM	GP	G	A	Pts	PIM
2010–11	Cedar Rapids RoughRiders	USHL	52	7	18	25	20	8	3	1	4	0
2011–12	Cedar Rapids RoughRiders	USHL	47	13	35	48	12	2	1	1	2	2
2012–13	Providence College	NCAA	28	11	7	18	10	—	—	—	—	—
2013–14	Providence College	NCAA	39	10	18	28	16	—	—	—	—	—
2014–15	Providence College	NCAA	40	14	24	38	24	—	—	—	—	—
2015–16	Providence College	NCAA	38	11	21	32	16	—	—	—	—	—
2015–16	Iowa Wild	AHL	7	1	1	2	0	—	—	—	—	—
2016–17	Iowa Wild	AHL	33	2	4	6	6	—	—	—	—	—
2017–18	Worcester Railers	ECHL	61	12	25	37	20	6	3	2	5	2
2018–19	Wheeling Nailers	ECHL	27	17	20	37	10	—	—	—	—	—
2018–19	Binghamton Devils	AHL	38	6	4	10	20	—	—	—	—	—
2019–20	Wheeling Nailers	ECHL	31	8	15	23	8	—	—	—	—	—
2020–21	Jacksonville Icemen	ECHL	58	18	27	45	24	—	—	—	—	—
2021–22	HKM Zvolen	Slovak	50	16	14	30	14	11	6	3	9	6
2022–23	Asiago	ICEHL	34	13	14	27	24	—	—	—	—	—
2023–24	Asiago	ICEHL	26	5	10	15	10	—	—	—	—	—
2024–25	Asiago	ICEHL	37	15	22	37	26	—	—	—	—	—
2024–25	HC Bolzano	ICEHL	1	1	0	1	0	11	1	4	5	4
2025–26	HC Pustertal	ICEHL	41	11	15	26	4	13	0	4	4	8
AHL totals			78	9	9	18	26	—	—	—	—	—
ICEHL totals			139	45	61	106	64	24	1	8	9	12

=== International ===
Year	Team	Event	GP	G	A	Pts	PIM
2025	Italy	WC (D1A)	5	0	3	3	2
2026	Italy	OG	3	0	0	0	0
2026	Italy	WC	7	1	0	1	4
Senior totals			15	1	3	4	6
