= HC Pustertal Wölfe =

- City: Bruneck, Italy
- League: ICE Hockey League
- Founded: 1954; 72 years ago
- Home arena: Intercable Arena
- Colours
- General manager: Patrick Bona
- Head coach: Jason Jaspers
- Captain: Raphael Andergassen
- Website: www.hcpustertal.com
Home colours	Away colours

Franchise history
- 1954–2001: EV MAK Bruneck
- 2001–2008: HC Pustertal
- 2008–2009: HC Red Orange Pustertal
- 2009–2014: Fiat Professional Wölfe

HC Pustertal Wölfe – Val Pusteria Wolves are an Italian professional ice hockey team from Bruneck, Italy. As of the 2021–22 season, the team plays in the ICE Hockey League (ICEHL). They formerly played in the Alps Hockey League and Serie A.

== Team history ==
The team was founded in 1954 as "EV Bruneck MAK" and played the first season in the Serie B in 1966. They won the championship in 1967–68 and 1968–69, but could not move up to the Seria A because their stadium was unfit for the top series. In 1971–72 they won the B championship and in 1972–73 they entered the Serie A for the first time. The Wolves played in Serie A for nearly thirty years in a row. The best results they achieved were second place in the 1981–82 season and third place in 1980–81.

Before the beginning of the 2001–02 season the Wolves were forced to leave Serie A due to financial reasons, but in 2003–04 the team returned to the league. The team name was changed in 2008 and in 2010. The official name is now "HC Pustertal Wölfe – Val Pusteria Wolves".

Ahead of the 2021–22 season HC Pustertal joined the Austrian Hockey League (ICEHL).

== Home arena ==
Until 2021 the Wolves home was the Rienzstadion, formerly called Leitner Solar Arena in Bruneck-Außerragen.

With the beginning of the 2021–22 season the HC Pustertal moved to its new home arena, the Intercable Arena in Bruneck, located in the western outskirts of the town.

The Intercable Arena Bruneck is a modern arena with a focus on ice sports. In addition to the main sport, ice hockey, which is played in the arena, the stadium also offers space for other sports such as figure skating, ice skating, curling, curling, sledge field hockey, short track and broomball. The Intercable Arena has a capacity of 3,100 spectators, which is made up of 1,650 seats and 1,450 standing places. In addition to the seating and standing areas, the arena also has a 250 square meters VIP area.

== Players ==
=== Current roster ===
Updated 25 May 2026

No.	Nat	Player	Pos	S/G	Age	Acquired	Birthplace
5	(Sweden)	Adam Almquist	D	L	35	2025	Jönköping, Sweden
40	(Italy)	Raphael Andergassen (C)	RW	R	32	2014	Bolzano, Italy
10	(United States)	Cole Bardreau	C	R	32	2025	Fairport, New York, United States
24	(United States)	Jon Blum (A)	D	R	37	2025	Long Beach, California, United States
28	(United States)	Henry Bowlby	LW	L	29	2025	Edina, Minnesota, United States
46	(Italy)	Ivan Deluca	LW	L	28	2021	Sterzing, Italy
77	(Italy)	Greg DiTomaso	D	R	30	2025	Toronto, Ontario, Canada
67	(Italy)	Mikael Frycklund	C	L	33	2023	Västerås, Sweden
21	(Italy)	Daniel Glira (A)	D	L	32	2021	Innichen, Italy
14	(Italy)	Alex Ierullo	LW	L	28	2025	Vaughan, Ontario, Canada
11	(Denmark)	Markus Lauridsen	D	L	35	2025	Gentofte, Denmark
93	(Canada)	JC Lipon	RW	R	32	2025	Regina, Saskatchewan, Canada
16	(Italy)	Alan Lobis	C	L	21	2025	Bolzano, Italy
22	(Italy)	Matthias Mantinger	LW	L	30	2021	Bolzano, Italy
36	(United States)	Austin Osmanski	D	L	28	2024	East Aurora, New York, United States
80	(Canada)	Eddie Pasquale	G	L	35	2024	Toronto, Ontario, Canada
34	(Italy)	Tommy Purdeller	RW	R	22	2024	Bruneck, Italy
35	(Italy)	Jakob Rabanser	G	L	25	2024	Brixen, Italy
45	(United States)	Austin Rueuschhoff	RW	R	28	2025	Wentzville, Missouri, United States
18	(Italy)	Nick Saracino	RW	L	34	2025	St. Louis, Missouri, United States
42	(Slovenia)	Rok Ticar	C	L	37	2025	Jesenice, Yugoslavia
55	(Italy)	Luca Zanatta	D	L	35	2024	Pieve di Cadore, Italy
19	(Italy)	Luciano Zandegiacomo	LW	L	22	2025	Pieve di Cadore, Italy

== Honours ==
=== Pre-season ===
Tatra Cup

- (gold) Winners (1): 2021
