= Mike Zanier =

Canadian-Italian ice hockey player (born 1962)

- Born: August 22, 1962 (age 63) Trail, British Columbia, Canada
- Height: 5 ft 11 in (180 cm)
- Weight: 185 lb (84 kg; 13 st 3 lb)
- Position: Goaltender
- Caught: Left
- Played for: Nottingham Panthers; HC Milano Saima; Asiago; HC Bolzano; Edmonton Oilers
- National team: Italy
- NHL draft: Undrafted
- Playing career: 1983–1999

Michael Zanier (born August 22, 1962) is a Canadian-born Italian former professional ice hockey goaltender who played extensively in Europe and in North American minor leagues.

Born in Trail, British Columbia, Zanier's junior career was spent with five different teams in the WHL. He was never drafted but signed with the Edmonton Oilers where he saw some NHL playing time. Zanier dressed for games 4 and 5 of the 1984 Stanley Cup Finals, due to Grant Fuhr being injured. He did not appear in either game. Although the Oilers won the Cup, Zanier's name was not engraved on it because he had not officially played in any NHL games. However, he did receive a Stanley Cup ring. Zanier played three games for Edmonton during the next season, but that was the extent of his NHL career. Zanier went on to play many seasons in Europe and represented Italy at the 1992 Winter Olympics.

== Career statistics ==
=== Regular season and playoffs ===
			Regular season									Playoffs
Season	Team	League	GP	W	L	T	MIN	GA	SO	GAA	SV%	GP	W	L	MIN	GA	SO	GAA	SV%
1979–80	New Westminster Bruins	WHL	1	0	0	0	20	3	0	9.00	.750	—	—	—	—	—	—	—	—
1980–81	New Westminster Bruins	WHL	49	11	27	1	2494	275	0	6.62	.847	—	—	—	—	—	—	—	—
1981–82	Spokane Flyers	WHL	9	1	7	0	476	55	0	6.93	.832	—	—	—	—	—	—	—	—
1981–82	Billings Bighorns	WHL	11	1	8	0	495	64	0	7.76	.836	—	—	—	—	—	—	—	—
1981–82	Medicine Hat Tigers	WHL	13	3	8	0	620	70	0	6.77	.860	—	—	—	—	—	—	—	—
1981–82	Calgary Wranglers	WHL	11	5	5	0	526	28	1	3.19	.905	1	0	0	25	1	0	2.40	.750
1982–83	Trail Smoke Eaters	WIHL	30	—	—	—	1734	116	0	4.01	—	—	—	—	—	—	—	—	—
1983–84	Moncton Alpines	AHL	31	11	15	1	1743	96	0	3.30	.885	—	—	—	—	—	—	—	—
1984–85	Edmonton Oilers	NHL	3	1	1	1	185	12	0	3.89	.880	—	—	—	—	—	—	—	—
1984–85	Nova Scotia Oilers	AHL	44	20	17	5	2484	143	1	3.45	—	—	—	—	—	—	—	—	—
1985–86	Indianapolis Checkers	IHL	47	21	10	0	2727	151	0	3.32	—	2	1	1	120	9	0	4.50	—
1986–87	Indianapolis Checkers	IHL	14	6	8	0	807	60	0	4.46	—	6	2	4	359	21	0	3.51	—
1987–88	HC Bolzano	ITA	33	—	—	—	—	—	—	—	—	—	—	—	—	—	—	—	—
1988–89	HC Bolzano	ITA	32	—	—	—	1920	114	2	3.56	—	2	—	—	—	—	—	5.00	—
1989–90	Asiago	ITA	—	—	—	—	—	—	—	—	—	—	—	—	—	—	—	—	—
1990–91	HC Milano Saima	ITA	45	—	—	—	2650	167	1	3.78	—	10	—	—	—	—	—	3.77	.886
1991–92	HC Milano Saima	ITA	24	—	—	—	1399	80	0	3.43	—	—	—	—	—	—	—	—	—
1991–92	HC Milano Saima	ALP	11	—	—	—	619	36	1	3.49	—	—	—	—	—	—	—	—	—
1992–93	Dallas Freeze	CHL	40	24	14	2	2384	150	1	3.78	.891	7	2	4	424	33	0	4.67	.878
1993–94	HC Milano Saima	ITA	20	—	—	—	1163	74	0	3.82	.880	—	—	—	—	—	—	—	—
1993–94	HC Milano Saima	ALP	27	—	—	—	1589	92	0	3.47	—	—	—	—	—	—	—	—	—
1994–95	HC Milano Saima	ITA	31	—	—	—	1755	108	0	3.69	.891	—	—	—	—	—	—	—	—
1994–95	HC Milano Saima	ALP	10	—	—	—	—	—	—	—	—	—	—	—	—	—	—	—	—
1995–96	HC Milano Saima	ITA	25	—	—	—	1496	79	2	3.17	.868	10	—	—	—	—	—	3.16	.886
1995–96	HC Milano Saima	ALP	2	—	—	—	—	—	—	5.00	—	—	—	—	—	—	—	—	—
1996–97	HC Milano Saima	ITA	28	—	—	—	1601	97	1	3.64	—	—	—	—	—	—	—	—	—
1996–97	HC Milano Saima	ALP	16	—	—	—	925	46	0	2.98	.891	—	—	—	—	—	—	—	—
1997–98	EC Hannover	GER-2	30	—	—	—	1798	98	0	3.27	—	—	—	—	—	—	—	—	—
1998–99	Nottingham Panthers	BISL	20	—	—	—	1158	68	1	3.52	.899	2	—	—	120	9	0	4.50	.857
1999–00	Olofström IK	SWE-3	31	—	—	—	1803	96	1	3.19	.882	—	—	—	—	—	—	—	—
NHL totals			3	1	1	1	185	12	0	3.89	.880	—	—	—	—	—	—	—	—

=== International ===
Year	Team	Event	GP	W	L	T	MIN	GA	SO	GAA	SV%
1990	Italy	WC-B	2	2	0	0	120	4	0	2.00	.920
1991	Italy	WC-B	1	0	0	0	20	0	0	0.00	1.000
1992	Italy	OLY	3	0	3	0	155	14	0	5.42	.854
Senior totals			6	2	3	0	295	18	0	3.66	—
