= Errol Rausse =

Canadian ice hockey player

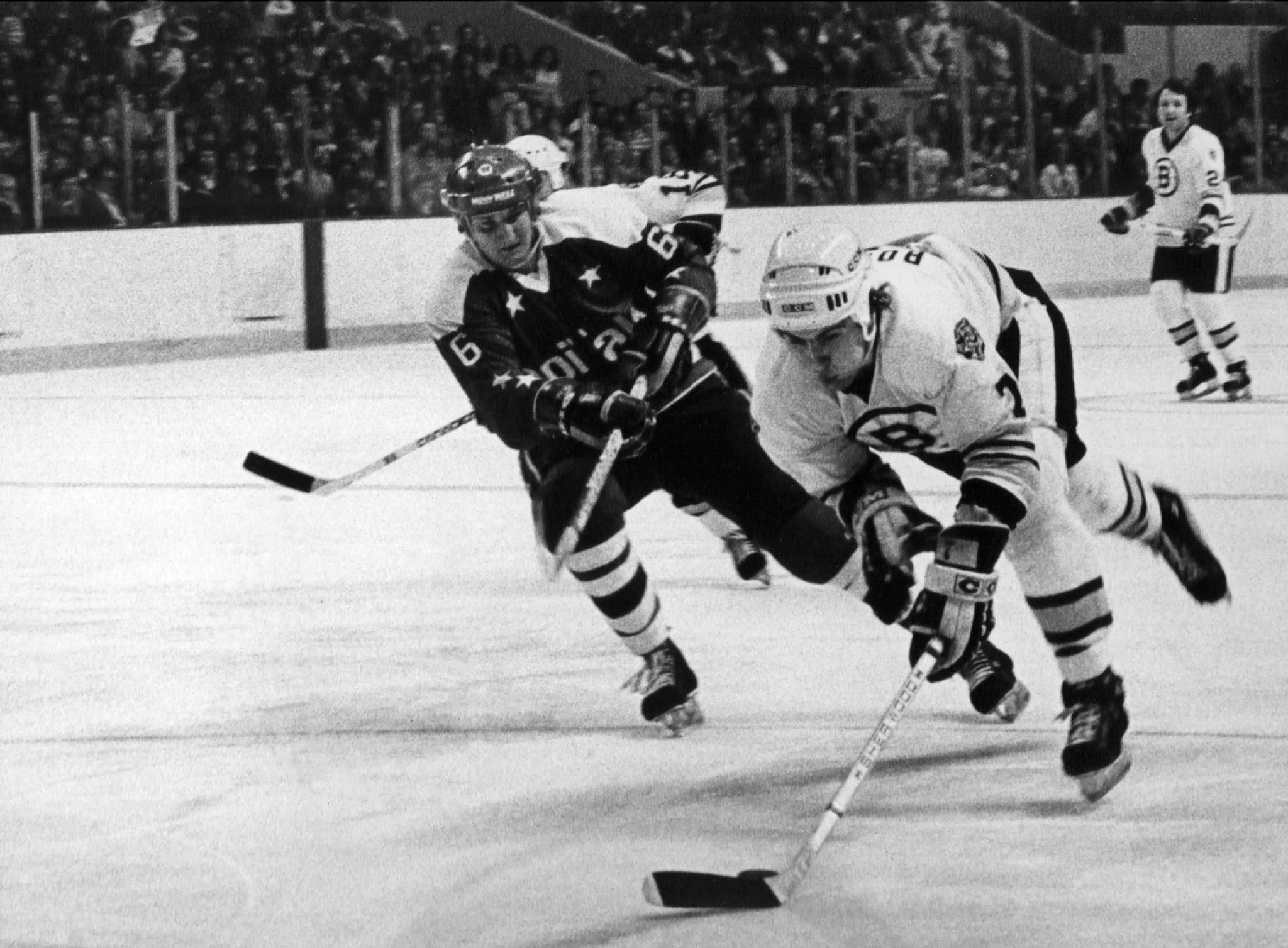
- Errol Rausse (left) chasing Ray Bourque in 1979
- Born: May 18, 1959 (age 66) Quesnel, British Columbia, Canada
- Height: 5 ft 11 in (180 cm)
- Weight: 181 lb (82 kg; 12 st 13 lb)
- Position: Left wing
- Shot: Left
- Played for: Washington Capitals; SG Cortina; Alleghe HC
- NHL draft: 24th overall, 1979; Washington Capitals
- Playing career: 1979–1994

Errol Attilio Rausse (born May 18, 1959) is a Canadian former ice hockey player. He played 31 games in the National Hockey League with the Washington Capitals from 1979 to 1982. The rest of his career, which lasted from 1979 to 1994, was mainly spent in the Italian Hockey League.

== Playing career ==
Rausse was born in Quesnel, British Columbia. He was selected 24th overall by the Washington Capitals in the 1979 NHL entry draft, and played 31 games over parts of three seasons with the Capitals from 1979 to 1982. Most of this time was spent in the minor leagues with the Hershey Bears, the Capitals minor league affiliate. He remained with the organization until 1983 when he left North America, and played eleven seasons in the Italian Hockey League with Alleghe HC before retiring in 1994.

== Career statistics ==
=== Regular season and playoffs ===
			Regular season					Playoffs
Season	Team	League	GP	G	A	Pts	PIM	GP	G	A	Pts	PIM
1975–76	Langley Lords	BCJHL	66	34	49	83	47	—	—	—	—	—
1975–76	Kamloops Chiefs	WCHL	—	—	—	—	—	10	0	0	0	0
1976–77	Kamloops Chiefs	WCHL	68	22	18	40	21	5	0	2	2	0
1977–78	Seattle Breakers	WCHL	72	62	92	154	60	—	—	—	—	—
1978–79	Seattle Breakers	WHL	71	65	47	112	17	—	—	—	—	—
1979–80	Washington Capitals	NHL	24	6	2	8	0	—	—	—	—	—
1979–80	Hershey Bears	AHL	53	14	17	31	2	11	7	7	14	2
1980–81	Washington Capitals	NHL	5	1	1	2	0	—	—	—	—	—
1980–81	Hershey Bears	AHL	57	19	27	46	18	10	2	6	8	2
1981–82	Washington Capitals	NHL	2	0	0	0	0	—	—	—	—	—
1981–82	Hershey Bears	AHL	59	18	25	43	6	5	0	4	4	2
1982–83	Hershey Bears	AHL	79	25	35	60	18	5	1	2	3	2
1983–84	SG Cortina	ITA	28	29	31	60	8	7	9	7	16	8
1984–85	HC Alleghe	ITA	26	39	45	84	10	8	11	14	25	10
1985–86	HC Alleghe	ITA	35	43	60	103	56	4	5	6	11	0
1986–87	HC Alleghe	ITA	37	37	47	84	26	—	—	—	—	—
1987–88	HC Alleghe	ITA	36	43	50	93	22	10	9	17	26	2
1988–89	HC Alleghe	Italy	30	37	30	67	12	—	—	—	—	—
1989–90	HC Alleghe	ITA	35	31	39	70	22	10	5	25	30	6
1990–91	HC Alleghe	ITA	30	21	36	57	4	6	3	2	5	0
1991–92	HC Alleghe	ALP	18	19	13	32	2	—	—	—	—	—
1991–92	HC Alleghe	ITA	18	8	22	30	4	9	7	9	16	2
1992–93	HC Alleghe	ALP	28	16	28	44	14	—	—	—	—	—
1992–93	HC Alleghe	ITA	16	5	18	23	0	9	6	5	11	4
1993–94	HC Alleghe	ALP	29	11	18	29	10	—	—	—	—	—
1993–94	HC Alleghe	ITA	7	4	4	8	2	3	1	1	2	4
ITA totals			298	297	382	679	166	66	56	86	142	36
NHL totals			31	7	3	10	0	—	—	—	—	—

=== International ===
Year	Team	Event	GP	G	A	Pts	PIM
1979	Canada	WJC	5	1	1	2	2
Junior totals			5	1	1	2	2

== Awards ==
- WCHL Second All-Star Team – 1978
