= Bob Manno =

Canadian-born Italian ice hockey player

- Born: October 31, 1956 (age 69) Niagara Falls, Ontario, Canada
- Height: 6 ft 0 in (183 cm)
- Weight: 185 lb (84 kg; 13 st 3 lb)
- Position: Defence
- Shot: Left
- Played for: Vancouver Canucks; Toronto Maple Leafs; Detroit Red Wings; HC Merano; HC Fassa; HC Devils Milano; HC Bolzano
- National team: Italy
- NHL draft: 26th overall, 1976; Vancouver Canucks
- WHA draft: 19th overall, 1976; Quebec Nordiques
- Playing career: 1976–1994

Robert John Manno (born October 31, 1956) is a Canadian-born Italian former professional ice hockey forward. He was born in Niagara Falls, Ontario.

Manno started his National Hockey League career with the Vancouver Canucks in 1976. He also played with the Toronto Maple Leafs and Detroit Red Wings. He participated in the 1982 NHL All-Star Game. He retired from the NHL after the 1985 season.

Then he went to Italy, playing for HC Merano, HC Fassa, HC Milano Saima (won one national title in 1990/91) and ended his career for HC Bolzano Foxes, winning a total of 3 Italian titles and 1 Alpenliga. Manno also played for the Italian national team on several occasions including at the A Pool of the 1982 World Ice Hockey Championships and 1983 World Ice Hockey Championships and at the 1992 Olympics.

After his retirement he began a new career as ice hockey coach in Italy (HC Bolzano, HC Milano 24, HC Merano and Asiago Hockey AS), then in Germany (Frankfurt Lions, Augsburger Panther, Straubing Tigers).

== Career statistics ==
=== Regular season and playoffs ===
			Regular season					Playoffs
Season	Team	League	GP	G	A	Pts	PIM	GP	G	A	Pts	PIM
1972–73	Niagara Falls Flyers	SOJHL	36	1	14	15	78	—	—	—	—	—
1973–74	Hamilton Red Wings	OHA-Jr.	63	3	19	22	105	—	—	—	—	—
1974–75	St. Catharines Black Hawks	OMJHL	70	9	38	47	171	4	0	1	1	23
1975–76	St. Catharines Black Hawks	OMJHL	55	9	54	63	87	4	1	4	5	14
1976–77	Vancouver Canucks	NHL	2	0	0	0	0	—	—	—	—	—
1976–77	Tulsa Oilers	CHL	73	18	36	54	109	9	1	7	8	19
1977–78	Vancouver Canucks	NHL	49	5	14	19	29	—	—	—	—	—
1977–78	Tulsa Oilers	CHL	20	5	15	20	21	—	—	—	—	—
1978–79	Vancouver Canucks	NHL	52	5	16	21	42	3	0	1	1	4
1978–79	Dallas Black Hawks	CHL	23	8	9	17	18	—	—	—	—	—
1979–80	Vancouver Canucks	NHL	40	3	14	17	14	4	1	0	1	6
1980–81	Vancouver Canucks	NHL	20	0	11	11	30	3	0	0	0	2
1980–81	Dallas Black Hawks	CHL	40	7	36	43	65	—	—	—	—	—
1981–82	Toronto Maple Leafs	NHL	72	9	41	50	67	—	—	—	—	—
1982–83	HC Merano	ITA	28	15	32	47	40	10	4	12	16	17
1983–84	Detroit Red Wings	NHL	62	9	13	22	60	4	0	3	3	0
1983–84	Adirondack Red Wings	AHL	12	5	11	16	18	—	—	—	—	—
1984–85	Detroit Red Wings	NHL	74	10	22	32	32	3	1	0	1	0
1985–86	HC Merano	ITA	36	28	78	106	68	6	1	8	9	12
1986–87	HC Merano	ITA	28	14	42	56	54	—	—	—	—	—
1987–88	HC Fassa	ITA	34	12	48	60	69	9	2	13	15	28
1988–89	HC Fassa	ITA	38	12	52	64	61	—	—	—	—	—
1989–90	HC Milano Saima	ITA	34	13	39	52	61	6	1	3	4	13
1990–91	HC Milano Saima	ITA	32	7	43	50	61	6	1	12	13	4
1991–92	HC Milano Saima	ITA	10	3	11	14	13	12	4	6	10	10
1992–93	HC Bolzano	ITA	15	3	13	16	9	11	1	8	9	20
1993–94	HC Bolzano	AL	24	5	29	34	69	—	—	—	—	—
1993–94	HC Bolzano	ITA	10	1	12	13	22	9	3	2	5	22
NHL totals			371	41	131	172	274	17	2	4	6	12
CHL totals			156	38	96	134	213	9	1	7	8	19
ITA totals			265	108	370	478	458	69	17	64	81	126

=== International ===
Year	Team	Event	GP	G	A	Pts	PIM
1982	Italy	WC	7	1	1	2	12
1983	Italy	WC	10	0	4	4	16
1986	Italy	WC B	7	2	1	3	10
1987	Italy	WC B	4	0	2	2	8
1989	Italy	WC B	7	0	5	5	5
1990	Italy	WC B	7	1	4	5	10
1991	Italy	WC B	7	0	7	7	4
1992	Italy	OG	7	1	2	3	22
Tier I Senior totals			24	2	7	9	50
Tier II Senior totals			32	3	19	22	37
