= Tony Fiore (ice hockey) =

Canadian-Italian ice hockey player

- Born: August 7, 1962 (age 63) Montreal, Quebec, Canada
- Height: 5 ft 11 in (180 cm)
- Weight: 165 lb (75 kg; 11 st 11 lb)
- Position: Centre
- Shot: Right
- Played for: AHL; Hershey Bears; Baltimore Skipjacks; CHL; Tulsa Oilers; IHL; Flint Generals; Serie A HC Auronzo; Alleghe HC; HC Milano Saima; HC Milano 24
- National team: Italy
- NHL draft: 165nd overall, 1982; Boston Bruins
- Playing career: 1980–1996

Tony Fiore (born August 7, 1962) is a Canadian-Italian retired professional ice hockey center.

== Career ==
After scoring 82 goals and 110 assists in 147 games with the QMJHL's Montreal Juniors between 1980 and 1982, Fiore was selected 165nd overall by the Boston Bruins at the 1982 NHL entry draft. He never played in NHL.

He spent the next two seasons split between the AHL and IHL with Hershey Bears and Flint Generals.

Later he played most in Italian Serie A with HC Auronzo (1984-1986), Alleghe Hockey (1986-1987), HC Milano Saima (1987-1992), SG Milano Saima (1993-1995) and HC Milano 24 (1995-1996). He won a scudetto with HC Milano Saima in year 1991.

He was a member of the Italian national team at the Group B World Championships in 1989 and 1991.

After his retirement during the summer 1996, he was hired as General Manager of HC Milano 24, but president Quintavalle fired Fiore due to lack of result in January 1997.

Later he became a sports agent.

== Career statistics ==
| | | | Regular season | | | | | Playoffs |
| Season | Team | League | GP | G | A | Pts | PIM | GP | G | A | Pts | PIM |
|---|---|---|---|---|---|---|---|---|---|---|---|---|
| 1980–81 | Montreal Juniors | QMJHL | 66 | 25 | 45 | 70 | 62 | 7 | 2 | 6 | 8 | 4 |
| 1981–82 | Montreal Juniors | QMJHL | 62 | 50 | 51 | 101 | 42 | 12 | 5 | 8 | 13 | 2 |
| 1982–83 | Flint Generals | IHL | 72 | 66 | 44 | 110 | 54 | 5 | 2 | 3 | 5 | 11 |
| 1983–84 | Flint Generals | IHL | 38 | 24 | 26 | 50 | 24 | — | — | — | — | — |
| 1983–84 | Hershey Bears | AHL | 36 | 5 | 8 | 13 | 6 | — | — | — | — | — |
| 1984–85 | Flint Generals | IHL | 4 | 1 | 1 | 2 | 2 | — | — | — | — | — |
| 1984–85 | HC Auronzo | Italy | 20 | 31 | 33 | 64 | 50 | — | — | — | — | — |
| 1985–86 | HC Auronzo | Italy | 34 | 72 | 57 | 129 | 46 | 5 | 5 | 6 | 11 | 8 |
| 1985–86 | Baltimore Skipjacks | AHL | 15 | 2 | 1 | 3 | 6 | — | — | — | — | — |
| 1986–87 | HC Alleghe | Italy | 31 | 41 | 50 | 91 | 60 | — | — | — | — | — |
| 1987–88 | HC Milano Saima | Italy2 | 33 | 70 | 66 | 136 | 46 | — | — | — | — | — |
| 1988–89 | HC Milano Saima | Italy | 38 | 26 | 39 | 65 | 25 | 6 | 4 | 5 | 9 | 0 |
| 1989–90 | HC Milano Saima | Italy | 34 | 36 | 33 | 69 | 29 | 6 | 7 | 4 | 11 | 2 |
| 1990–91 | HC Milano Saima | Italy | 33 | 28 | 37 | 65 | 6 | 9 | 5 | 8 | 13 | 0 |
| 1991–92 | HC Milano Saima | Alpenliga | 20 | 7 | 11 | 18 | 10 | — | — | — | — | — |
| 1991–92 | HC Milano Saima | Italy | 17 | 12 | 13 | 25 | 6 | 12 | 1 | 5 | 6 | 9 |
| 1992–93 | Tulsa Oilers | CHL | 37 | 23 | 35 | 58 | 67 | 12 | 11 | 10 | 21 | 22 |
| 1993–94 | HC Milano Saima | Alpenliga | 28 | 15 | 17 | 32 | 12 | — | — | — | — | — |
| 1993–94 | HC Milano Saima | Italy | 22 | 14 | 20 | 34 | 8 | — | — | — | — | — |
| 1994–95 | HC Milano Saima | Italy | 12 | 10 | 4 | 14 | 6 | — | — | — | — | — |
| 1994–95 | HC Milano Saima | Italy | 40 | 14 | 27 | 41 | 28 | — | — | — | — | — |
| 1995–96 | HC Milano Saima | Alpenliga | 8 | 3 | 1 | 4 | 2 | — | — | — | — | — |
| 1995–96 | HC Milano Saima | Italy | 25 | 16 | 19 | 35 | 12 | 13 | 2 | 7 | 9 | 4 |
| AHL totals | | | 51 | 7 | 9 | 16 | 12 | — | — | — | — | — |
| IHL totals | | | 114 | 91 | 71 | 162 | 80 | 5 | 2 | 3 | 5 | 11 |
| Italy totals | | | 294 | 290 | 328 | 618 | 270 | 51 | 24 | 35 | 59 | 23 |

== Awards and achievements ==
- Serie A:

HC Milano Saima: 1990-1991

- Gary F. Longman Memorial Trophy: 1982-1983
