= Rick Bragnalo =

Canadian retired ice hockey centre

- Born: December 1, 1951 (age 73); Fort William, Ontario, Canada
- Height: 5 ft 8 in (173 cm)
- Weight: 155 lb (70 kg; 11 st 1 lb)
- Position: Centre
- Shot: Left
- Played for: Washington Capitals; HC Brunico; HC Milan
- National team: Italy
- NHL draft: Undrafted
- Playing career: 1974–1992

Richard James Bragnalo (born December 1, 1951) is a Canadian-Italian retired ice hockey centre. He played 145 games in the National Hockey League with the Washington Capitals from 1976 to 1979. The rest of his career, which lasted from 1974 to 1992, was mainly spent in the Italian Serie A. Internationally Bragnalo played for the Italian national team at six World Championships.

== Playing career ==
Bragnalo was born in Fort William, Ontario. After playing college hockey at the University of Denver, Bragnalo was signed by the Washington Capitals as a free agent in 1976. Bragnalo played parts of four seasons for the Capitals. After playing a few years in the minors, Bragnalo moved on to playing hockey in the Italian Serie A with Val Pusteria Wolves, former EV Brunico, and with his Italian heritage, he was able to play for Italy on several occasions including at the A Pool of the 1982 and 1983 World Championships. He signed for HC Milano Saima in 1990, scoring the goal that permitted Milano to win the league in 1990/91. He retired in 1992.

== Career statistics ==
=== Regular season and playoffs ===
			Regular season					Playoffs
Season	Team	League	GP	G	A	Pts	PIM	GP	G	A	Pts	PIM
1968–69	Fort William Beavers	TBJHL	2	0	0	0	2	—	—	—	—	—
1968–69	Fort William Canadians	TBJHL	36	35	37	72	17	5	4	3	7	11
1969–70	Fort William Canadians	TBJHL	23	15	16	31	23	—	—	—	—	—
1970–71	University of Denver	WCHA	36	13	16	29	20	—	—	—	—	—
1971–72	University of Denver	WCHA	38	11	7	18	24	—	—	—	—	—
1972–73	University of Denver	WCHA	34	12	21	33	52	—	—	—	—	—
1973–74	University of Denver	WCHA	29	24	22	46	22	—	—	—	—	—
1974–75	Dayton Gems	IHL	75	41	72	113	50	14	10	7	17	36
1975–76	Washington Capitals	NHL	19	2	10	12	8	—	—	—	—	—
1975–76	Dayton Gems	IHL	48	29	34	63	55	—	—	—	—	—
1976–77	Washington Capitals	NHL	80	11	12	23	16	—	—	—	—	—
1977–78	Washington Capitals	NHL	44	2	13	15	22	—	—	—	—	—
1977–78	Hershey Bears	AHL	30	11	17	28	15	—	—	—	—	—
1978–79	Washington Capitals	NHL	2	0	0	0	0	—	—	—	—	—
1978–79	Hershey Bears	AHL	77	21	39	60	41	4	0	1	1	2
1979–80	Hershey Bears	AHL	1	0	0	0	0	—	—	—	—	—
1979–80	Port Huron Flags	IHL	67	22	61	83	26	11	3	10	13	12
1980–81	HC Brunico	ITA	28	29	43	72	24	15	6	10	16	45
1981–82	HC Brunico	ITA	32	33	48	81	63	6	7	8	15	2
1982–83	HC Brunico	ITA	32	49	59	108	21	—	—	—	—	—
1983–84	HC Brunico	ITA	26	26	42	68	44	7	7	8	15	20
1984–85	HC Brunico	ITA	18	18	27	45	12	6	4	8	12	4
1985–86	HC Brunico	ITA	36	23	43	66	36	5	4	7	11	2
1986–87	HC Brunico	ITA	42	25	37	62	38	—	—	—	—	—
1987–88	HC Brunico	ITA	35	21	30	51	38	8	4	14	18	8
1988–89	HC Brunico	ITA	41	27	30	57	40	—	—	—	—	—
1990–91	HC Milano Saima	ITA	35	10	23	33	8	10	2	8	10	6
1991–92	HC Milano Saima	ITA	14	4	9	13	2	13	1	3	4	0
1991–92	HC Milano Saima	ALP	20	4	3	7	2	—	—	—	—	—
ITA totals			339	265	391	656	326	70	35	66	101	87
NHL totals			145	15	35	50	46	—	—	—	—	—

=== International ===
Year	Team	Event	GP	G	A	Pts	PIM
1981	Italy	WC-B	7	4	7	11	22
1982	Italy	WC	7	3	2	5	8
1983	Italy	WC	10	1	2	3	6
1985	Italy	WC-B	7	1	2	3	10
1986	Italy	WC-B	7	1	1	2	0
1987	Italy	WC-B	7	3	5	8	10
Senior totals			45	13	19	32	56
