= Paul Beraldo =

Canadian ice hockey player (born 1967)

- Born: October 5, 1967 (age 58) Hamilton, Ontario, Canada
- Height: 5 ft 11 in (180 cm)
- Weight: 176 lb (80 kg; 12 st 8 lb)
- Position: Centre
- Shot: Right
- Played for: Boston Bruins
- National team: Canada and Italy
- NHL draft: 139th overall, 1986; Boston Bruins
- Playing career: 1987–2001

Paul Beraldo (born October 5, 1967) is a retired Italian-Canadian professional ice hockey centre. He was selected 139th overall in the 1986 NHL entry draft by the Boston Bruins. He played ten games for the Bruins during the 1987–88 and 1988–89 seasons.

Beraldo has also played for both the Canadian and the Italian national ice hockey teams.

== Playing career ==
Beraldo was born in Hamilton, Ontario. Having been selected by the Boston Bruins in the 1986 NHL entry draft, Beraldo was assigned to play for their farm team, the Maine Mariners, in the American Hockey League (AHL) during the 1987–88 season. He played for Maine in the AHL for three seasons, during which time he stepped up to play for Boston in the National Hockey League (NHL) three times during the 1987–88 season and seven times during the 1988–89 season, although he failed to score any points during these games.

After the 1989–90 season, Beraldo signed with HC Milano Saima in the Italian Serie A, where he helped them to win the league in 1991. The following season, he stayed with Milano Saima, playing in Serie A and the international Alpenliga. Staying in Milan, he continued to play in Serie A and the Alpenliga the following season, 1992–93, with HC Lion Milano.

Leaving Italy for Germany in the 1993–94 season, Beraldo played for Berliner SC Preussen in what turned out to be the final season of the old German first division. He returned to Italy at the end of the season to play three games for SG Milano Saima in the Italian playoffs. After one game with Milano Saima at the start of the 1994–95 season, he returned to Germany to play for TuS Geretsried in the German second division. He then finished the season back in North America playing for Brantford Smoke in the Colonial Hockey League.

Returning to Germany for the 1995–96 season, Beraldo played for four teams over the next three seasons in the Deutsche Eishockey Liga (DEL) – EC Ratingen Löwen, Adler Mannheim (winning the league with them in 1996–97), Kassel Huskies and Star Bulls Rosenheim. He joined HC Fribourg-Gottéron in the Swiss Nationalliga A for the 1998–99 season, during which time he also appeared for them in the International Ice Hockey Federation's European Hockey League.

After sitting out the 1999–00 season, Beraldo moved onto his fourth European country when he joined up with the Sheffield Steelers in the United Kingdom for the 2000–01 Ice Hockey Superleague (ISL) season. Finishing his ice hockey career on a high, Beraldo helped Sheffield to a Grand Slam of the Benson & Hedges Cup, Challenge Cup, league championship and playoff championship. Currently Beraldo's son Adrien plays professionally for the Toledo Walleye. (ECHL) and his nephew plays Jr in the competitive PJHL in Glanbrook.

== Honours ==
- Serie A champion with HC Milano Saima in 1990–91.
- DEL champion with Adler Mannheim in 1996–97.
- Benson & Hedges Cup, Challenge Cup, ISL and ISL playoff champion with the Sheffield Steelers in the 2000–01 season.

== Career statistics ==
=== Regular season and playoffs ===
| | | | Regular season | | | | | Playoffs |
| Season | Team | League | GP | G | A | Pts | PIM | GP | G | A | Pts | PIM |
|---|---|---|---|---|---|---|---|---|---|---|---|---|
| 1983–84 | Stoney Creek Warriors | NDJCHL | 35 | 18 | 23 | 41 | 27 | — | — | — | — | — |
| 1984–85 | Grimsby Peach Kings | NDJCHL | 25 | 9 | 4 | 13 | 24 | — | — | — | — | — |
| 1984–85 | Dixie Beehives | OPJAHL | 2 | 0 | 0 | 0 | 2 | — | — | — | — | — |
| 1985–86 | Sault Ste. Marie Greyhounds | OHL | 61 | 15 | 13 | 29 | 48 | — | — | — | — | — |
| 1986–87 | Sault Ste. Marie Greyhounds | OHL | 63 | 39 | 51 | 90 | 117 | 4 | 3 | 2 | 5 | 6 |
| 1987–88 | Maine Mariners | AHL | 62 | 22 | 15 | 37 | 112 | 2 | 0 | 0 | 0 | 19 |
| 1987–88 | Boston Bruins | NHL | 3 | 0 | 0 | 0 | 0 | — | — | — | — | — |
| 1988–89 | Maine Mariners | AHL | 73 | 25 | 28 | 53 | 134 | — | — | — | — | — |
| 1988–89 | Boston Bruins | NHL | 7 | 0 | 0 | 0 | 4 | — | — | — | — | — |
| 1989–90 | Maine Mariners | AHL | 51 | 14 | 27 | 41 | 31 | — | — | — | — | — |
| 1989–90 | Canadian National Team | Intl | 9 | 2 | 9 | 11 | 10 | — | — | — | — | — |
| 1990–91 | HC Milano Saima | ITA | 34 | 34 | 27 | 61 | 77 | 10 | 12 | 12 | 24 | 13 |
| 1991–92 | HC Milano Saima | ALP | 10 | 5 | 7 | 12 | 33 | — | — | — | — | — |
| 1991–92 | HC Milano Saima | ITA | 16 | 23 | 13 | 36 | 24 | 12 | 10 | 5 | 15 | 11 |
| 1992–93 | HC Devils Milano | ALP | 30 | 25 | 19 | 44 | 47 | — | — | — | — | — |
| 1992–93 | HC Devils Milano | ITA | 16 | 16 | 11 | 27 | 10 | 11 | 8 | 3 | 11 | 13 |
| 1993–94 | BSC Preussen | GER | 12 | 6 | 10 | 16 | 14 | 2 | 1 | 1 | 2 | 0 |
| 1993–94 | SG Milano Saima | ITA | — | — | — | — | — | 3 | 0 | 2 | 2 | 10 |
| 1994–95 | SG Milano Saima | Serie A | 1 | 0 | 0 | 0 | 0 | — | — | — | — | — |
| 1994–95 | TuS Geretsried | GER-2 | 18 | 28 | 30 | 58 | 56 | — | — | — | — | — |
| 1994–95 | Brantford Smoke | CoHL | 22 | 7 | 17 | 24 | 22 | — | — | — | — | — |
| 1995–96 | Ratinger Löwen | DEL | 16 | 14 | 7 | 21 | 56 | — | — | — | — | — |
| 1996–97 | Adler Mannheim | DEL | 50 | 23 | 25 | 48 | 71 | 9 | 3 | 2 | 5 | 22 |
| 1997–98 | Kassel Huskies | DEL | 18 | 8 | 8 | 16 | 18 | — | — | — | — | — |
| 1997–98 | Star Bulls Rosenheim | DEL | 43 | 5 | 5 | 10 | 12 | — | — | — | — | — |
| 1998–99 | HC Fribourg-Gottéron | NLA | 21 | 5 | 12 | 17 | 83 | — | — | — | — | — |
| 2000–01 | Sheffield Steelers | ISL | 23 | 12 | 12 | 24 | 18 | 8 | 4 | 3 | 7 | 14 |
| AHL totals | | | 186 | 61 | 70 | 131 | 277 | 2 | 0 | 0 | 0 | 19 |
| NHL totals | | | 10 | 0 | 0 | 0 | 0 | — | — | — | — | — |

=== International ===
| Year | Team | Event | GP | G | A | Pts | PIM |
|---|---|---|---|---|---|---|---|
| 1994 | Italy | WC | 6 | 2 | 1 | 3 | 6 |
| Senior totals | | | 6 | 2 | 1 | 3 | 6 |
