= Joe Busillo =

Canadian ice hockey player

- Born: May 13, 1970 (age 54); Toronto, Ontario, Canada
- Height: 6 ft 0 in (183 cm)
- Weight: 219 lb (99 kg; 15 st 9 lb)
- Position: Left wing
- Shot: Left
- Played for: Milano Vipers; Manchester Storm; Schwenninger Wild Wings; Eisbären Berlin; Kölner Haie; Varese HC; Alleghe HC; Sault Ste. Marie Greyhounds; Oshawa Generals
- National team: Italy
- Playing career: 1992–2006

Giuseppe Busillo (born May 13, 1970) is a former professional ice hockey player. Busillo represented Italy in the 1998 and 2006 Winter Olympics.

== Career statistics ==
=== Regular season and playoffs ===
			Regular season					Playoffs
Season	Team	League	GP	G	A	Pts	PIM	GP	G	A	Pts	PIM
1987–88	Oshawa Generals	OHL	59	11	11	22	84	—	—	—	—	—
1988–89	Oshawa Generals	OHL	59	17	26	43	153	6	0	3	3	7
1989–90	Oshawa Generals	OHL	59	19	29	48	148	17	4	4	8	38
1990–91	Sault Ste. Marie Greyhounds	OHL	53	31	35	66	112	11	6	10	16	31
1991–92	Alleghe Hockey	Italy	16	9	13	22	16	—	—	—	—	—
1992–93	Alleghe Hockey	AL	30	17	—	—	—	—	—	—	—	—
1992–93	Alleghe Hockey	Italy	16	13	14	27	8	5	2	4	6	4
1993–94	Alleghe Hockey	AL	—	—	—	—	—	—	—	—	—	—
1993–94	Alleghe Hockey	Italy	21	11	14	25	43	—	—	—	—	—
1994–95	Alleghe Hockey	AL	7	3	4	7	35	—	—	—	—	—
1994–95	Alleghe Hockey	Italy	32	13	16	29	73	—	—	—	—	—
1995–96	Alleghe Hockey	AL	7	6	6	12	28	—	—	—	—	—
1995–96	HC Varese	Italy	30	21	17	38	58	4	1	1	2	35
1996–97	Kölner Haie	DEL	42	7	16	23	79	4	1	1	2	8
1997–98	Kölner Haie	DEL	45	4	11	15	91	3	0	0	0	8
1998–99	Kölner Haie	DEL	52	4	3	7	89	5	0	1	1	10
1999–2000	Eisbären Berlin	DEL	56	3	10	13	67	9	2	4	6	29
2000–01	SERC Wild Wings	DEL	59	3	10	13	110	—	—	—	—	—
2001–02	Manchester Storm	BISL	48	9	14	23	94	7	1	5	6	0
2002–03	HC Milano	Italy	36	12	16	28	84	9	5	5	10	20
2003–04	HC Milano	Italy	35	25	23	48	26	12	4	5	9	12
2004–05	HC Milano	Italy	22	5	13	18	41	14	1	5	6	18
2005–06	HC Milano	Italy	44	11	21	32	65	7	0	3	3	0
Italy totals			252	120	147	267	414	51	13	23	36	89
DEL totals			254	21	50	71	436	21	3	6	9	55

=== International ===
Year	Team	Event	GP	G	A	Pts	PIM
1995	Italy	WC	6	1	1	2	10
1997	Italy	WC	8	0	3	3	2
1998	Italy	OG	4	0	1	1	4
1998	Italy	WC	6	0	1	1	4
1999	Italy	WC	3	3	0	3	2
1999	Italy	WC Q	3	2	2	4	2
2000	Italy	OGQ	3	1	1	2	2
2000	Italy	WC	5	0	0	0	18
2001	Italy	WC	6	0	1	1	10
2002	Italy	WC	6	1	0	1	8
2004	Italy	WC D1	5	1	3	4	6
2005	Italy	WC D1	5	2	1	3	14
2006	Italy	OG	5	1	1	2	6
2006	Italy	WC	6	3	2	5	6
Senior totals			71	15	17	32	94
