= Jim Camazzola =

Canadian ice hockey player

- Born: January 5, 1964 (age 62) Vancouver, British Columbia, Canada
- Height: 5 ft 11 in (180 cm)
- Weight: 190 lb (86 kg; 13 st 8 lb)
- Position: Left wing
- Shot: Left
- Played for: Chicago Blackhawks; HC Asiago; HC Courmaosta; HC Varese; Berlin Capitals; Augsburger Panther; HC Bolzano
- National team: Italy
- NHL draft: 196th overall, 1982; Chicago Blackhawks
- Playing career: 1984–2002

James "Jimmy" Camazzola (born January 5, 1964) is a Canadian-born Italian former professional ice hockey forward. He played 3 games in the National Hockey League with the Chicago Blackhawks during the 1983-84 and 1986–87 seasons. The rest of his career, which lasted from 1984 to 2002, was mainly spent in top leagues of Germany and Italy. Internationally he played for the Italian national team at the 1992 and 1994 Winter Olympics, and the 1992 World Championships. His older brother, Tony Camazzola, also played in the NHL with the Washington Capitals.

== Playing career ==
His only National Hockey League appearances were three games with the Chicago Blackhawks in 1983-84 and 1987. He played three seasons in North America before playing several more in the top leagues of Germany and Italy. He was also the Coach from Associazione Sportiva Asiago Hockey.

Camazzola represented Italy internationally at the 1992 and 1994 Winter Olympics.

Camazzola was an assistant hockey coach at Simon Fraser University from 2011 to 2019. In 2018, Camazzola was named the first head coach of the Vancouver NE Chiefs.

== Career statistics ==
=== Regular season and playoffs ===
| | | | Regular season | | | | | Playoffs |
| Season | Team | League | GP | G | A | Pts | PIM | GP | G | A | Pts | PIM |
|---|---|---|---|---|---|---|---|---|---|---|---|---|
| 1982–83 | Kamloops Junior Oilers | WHL | 66 | 57 | 58 | 115 | 54 | 7 | 4 | 1 | 5 | 2 |
| 1983–84 | Chicago Blackhawks | NHL | 1 | 0 | 0 | 0 | 0 | — | — | — | — | — |
| 1983–84 | Seattle Breakers | WHL | 3 | 1 | 1 | 2 | 0 | — | — | — | — | — |
| 1983–84 | Kamloops Junior Oilers | WHL | 29 | 26 | 24 | 50 | 25 | 17 | 12 | 19 | 31 | 44 |
| 1984–85 | New Westminster Bruins | WHL | 25 | 19 | 29 | 48 | 25 | 11 | 10 | 12 | 22 | 4 |
| 1985–86 | Nova Scotia Oilers | AHL | 3 | 0 | 0 | 0 | 0 | — | — | — | — | — |
| 1985–86 | Saginaw Generals | IHL | 42 | 16 | 22 | 38 | 10 | 8 | 0 | 3 | 3 | 15 |
| 1986–87 | Chicago Blackhawks | NHL | 2 | 0 | 0 | 0 | 0 | — | — | — | — | — |
| 1986–87 | Nova Scotia Oilers | AHL | 48 | 13 | 18 | 31 | 31 | 3 | 0 | 0 | 0 | 0 |
| 1987–88 | Maine Mariners | AHL | 62 | 13 | 23 | 36 | 80 | 10 | 1 | 7 | 8 | 8 |
| 1988–89 | HC Asiago | ITA | 33 | 8 | 29 | 37 | 58 | 11 | 6 | 8 | 14 | 10 |
| 1989–90 | HC Asiago | ITA | 34 | 11 | 49 | 60 | 12 | 6 | 2 | 5 | 7 | 6 |
| 1990–91 | HC Asiago | ITA | 24 | 11 | 19 | 30 | 51 | 5 | 2 | 2 | 4 | 0 |
| 1991–92 | HC Asiago | ITA | 16 | 6 | 10 | 16 | 9 | 11 | 6 | 9 | 15 | 2 |
| 1992–93 | HC Asiago | ITA | 11 | 5 | 6 | 11 | 2 | 8 | 0 | 6 | 6 | 0 |
| 1993–94 | HC Courmaosta | ITA | 18 | 9 | 12 | 21 | 6 | 6 | 3 | 5 | 8 | 8 |
| 1994–95 | HC Courmaosta | ITA | 28 | 18 | 16 | 34 | 41 | 6 | 2 | 6 | 8 | 8 |
| 1995–96 | HC Varese | ITA | 22 | 3 | 12 | 15 | 6 | 8 | 2 | 6 | 8 | 6 |
| 1996–97 | Berlin Capitals | DEL | 42 | 8 | 13 | 21 | 56 | — | — | — | — | — |
| 1997–98 | Augsburger Panther | DEL | 50 | 5 | 14 | 19 | 34 | — | — | — | — | — |
| 1998–99 | Augsburger Panther | DEL | 44 | 6 | 7 | 13 | 59 | 5 | 1 | 0 | 1 | 2 |
| 1999–00 | Augsburger Panther | DEL | 49 | 8 | 10 | 18 | 50 | 3 | 1 | 1 | 2 | 2 |
| 2000–01 | Augsburger Panther | DEL | 42 | 12 | 12 | 24 | 38 | — | — | — | — | — |
| 2001–02 | HC Bolzano | ITA | 29 | 10 | 10 | 20 | 37 | — | — | — | — | — |
| ITA totals | | | 210 | 78 | 162 | 240 | 220 | 66 | 26 | 48 | 74 | 32 |
| NHL totals | | | 3 | 0 | 0 | 0 | 0 | — | — | — | — | — |

=== International ===
| Year | Team | Event | GP | G | A | Pts | PIM |
|---|---|---|---|---|---|---|---|
| 1992 | Italy | OLY | 7 | 0 | 2 | 2 | 18 |
| 1992 | Italy | WC | 5 | 1 | 1 | 2 | 10 |
| 1994 | Italy | OLY | 7 | 2 | 2 | 4 | 4 |
| Senior totals | | | 19 | 3 | 5 | 8 | 32 |
