= Thomas Milani =

Canadian-born Italian ice hockey player (1952–2021)

- Born: April 13, 1952 Thunder Bay, Ontario, Canada
- Died: December 28, 2021 (aged 69)
- Height: 5 ft 7 in (170 cm)
- Weight: 165 lb (75 kg; 11 st 11 lb)
- Position: Right wing
- Shot: Right
- Played for: Minnesota Fighting Saints (WHA); Kalamazoo Wings (IHL)
- National team: Italy
- NHL draft: Undrafted
- Playing career: 1976–1988

Thomas Allan Milani (April 13, 1952 – December 28, 2021) was a Canadian-born Italian professional and Olympic ice hockey player.

During the 1976–77 season, Milani played two games in the World Hockey Association with the Minnesota Fighting Saints.

Milani also played for the Italian national team on several occasions including at the A Pool of the 1982 World Ice Hockey Championships and 1983 World Ice Hockey Championships and at the 1984 Olympics.

He died in December 2021, at the age of 69.

== Career statistics ==
			Regular season					Playoffs
Season	Team	League	GP	G	A	Pts	PIM	GP	G	A	Pts	PIM
1972–73	University of Minnesota-Duluth	NCAA	36	21	14	35	20	—	—	—	—	—
1973–74	University of Minnesota-Duluth	NCAA	36	26	17	43	35	—	—	—	—	—
1974–75	University of Minnesota-Duluth	NCAA	38	27	30	57	36	—	—	—	—	—
1975–76	University of Minnesota-Duluth	NCAA	36	26	37	63	40	—	—	—	—	—
1976–77	Syracuse Blazers	NAHL-Sr.	72	56	65	121	15	9	6	7	13	2
1976–77	Minnesota Fighting Saints	WHA	2	0	0	0	0	—	—	—	—	—
1977–78	Kalamazoo Wings	IHL	79	44	41	85	41	10	10	3	13	15
1978–79	Kalamazoo Wings	IHL	78	52	54	106	42	14	9	10	19	51
1979–80	Kalamazoo Wings	IHL	78	49	62	111	64	17	13	17	30	4
1980–81	HC Bolzano	Italy	—	—	—	—	—	—	—	—	—	—
1981–82	HC Asiago	Italy	32	60	51	111	20	—	—	—	—	—
1982–83	HC Asiago	Italy	32	38	40	78	22	—	—	—	—	—
1983–84	HC Bruneck	Italy	16	24	15	39	10	—	—	—	—	—
1984–85	HC Como	Italy	26	24	31	55	24	—	—	—	—	—
1985–86	HC Merano	Italy	36	36	46	82	14	—	—	—	—	—
1986–87	HC Varese	Italy	36	11	14	25	26	—	—	—	—	—
1987–88	Fiemme Cavalese	Italy	34	16	35	51	6	—	—	—	—	—
WHA totals			2	0	0	0	0	—	—	—	—	—
IHL totals			235	145	157	302	147	41	32	30	62	70
Italy totals			212	209	232	441	122	—	—	—	—	—

== Awards and honours ==
Award	Year
All-WCHA Second team	1974–75
All-WCHA First team	1975–76
NAHL Rookie-of-the-Year	1976–77
NAHL First Team All-Star	1976–77
IHL Second Team All-Star	1977–78
IHL Second Team All-Star	1978–79
