= Larry Trader =

Canadian ice hockey player (1963–2024)

- Born: July 7, 1963 Barry's Bay, Ontario, Canada
- Died: September 4, 2024 (aged 61) Barry's Bay, Ontario, Canada
- Height: 6 ft 1 in (185 cm)
- Weight: 180 lb (82 kg; 12 st 12 lb)
- Position: Defence
- Shot: Left
- Played for: Detroit Red Wings; St. Louis Blues; Montreal Canadiens
- NHL draft: 86th overall, 1981; Detroit Red Wings
- Playing career: 1983–1994

Lawrence Jerome Trader (July 7, 1963 – September 4, 2024) was a Canadian professional ice hockey defenceman. He played a handful of games at the NHL level, but was mostly known for his high scoring in the American Hockey League and overseas. He last played for Varese Hockey Club in Italy. He was the cousin of former NHL player Jim Peplinski.

== Professional career ==
=== Minor league hockey ===
Trader was born in Barry's Bay, Ontario. Growing up playing hockey, Trader developed into a mobile defenceman with a great shot from the blueline. He attracted a lot of attention playing Junior hockey for the Gloucester Rangers of the CJHL. In the 1979–80 season, Trader scored 33 points in 50 games as a defenceman and was named CJHL Best Midget-Age Player and invited to the All-star team. His scoring numbers were impressive and the London Knights picked Trader with their 1st pick (3rd overall) to join their team for the 1980–81 season. In the OHL, Trader continued to put up big numbers and the NHL took notice. The Detroit Red Wings drafted Trader with their 3rd pick (86 overall) in the 1981 NHL draft. After being selected by the Red Wings, Trader remained on the Knights to develop and he responded by putting up his largest numbers to date. In 68 games that season, Trader scored 19 goals and 37 assists to go along with 161 penalty minutes. With impressive numbers now on his resume, Trader was asked to play for Team Canada in the 1983 World Junior Championships. Scoring five points in the tough 7-game series, the Red Wings felt Trader was finally ready for the NHL.

=== Playing in the NHL ===
In the 1982–83 season, Trader played 15 games as a rookie and added two assists. He showed promise, but Detroit felt he still needed time to develop and Trader was sent to Detroit's minor league affiliate, the Adirondack Red Wings of the AHL. In 1983–84, Trader posted 41 points with Adirondack and was second on the team in defensive scoring. Detroit came calling again for the 1984–85 season and Trader responded, played great defensive hockey and posting 10 points in 40 games. After a short playoff run, Trader was sent back down for another season with Adirondack. He played in 64 games that season putting up 56 points to lead the team in defensive scoring and was named to the AHL second all-star team. He joined Adirondack in their playoff run and helped them win the Calder Cup over the Hershey Bears in six games. Trader was named AHL's Playoff Points and Playoff Assists Leader for 1986 and even scored the Calder Cup-winning goal in game six.

After the celebration, Trader received more good news, he had been selected to join the Canadian National Team. Trader played 48 games for the team, scored 20 points and won the Spengler Cup and had a fourth-place finish in the 1987 Men's World Ice Hockey Championships. During his run with Team Canada, Trader found out over the phone that he was traded to the St. Louis Blues for Lee Norwood on August 7, 1986.

Trader only made it back to the United States for five games with the Blues in 1986–87, but would join the Blues for a single game in 1987–88 before being traded to the Montreal Canadiens on October 13, 1987. He was traded along with a third round draft pick for Gaston Gingras and Montreal's third round draft pick. He was sent down for a short stint with the Sherbrooke Canadiens before playing the remaining 30 games for Montreal while scoring six points. After the season, he was let go and was signed as a free agent by the Hartford Whalers on August 3, 1988. He would never make it to the parent club, but played out the 1988–89 season with the Binghamton Whalers of the AHL, where he again led a team in defensive scoring with his 11 goals and 40 assists.

=== International play ===
After being let go by Hartford, Trader decided to head overseas. He began his journey in Austria playing for the Klagenfurt AC. Trader excelled in the Erste Bank Hockey League and was 4th on the team in scoring with 34. For the 1990–91 season, Trader headed to Italy to play in the Serie A for the Brunico SG. He played with the team for three years amassing 101 total points, before leaving halfway through the 1992–93 season to rejoin the Austrian Hockey League and play four games for the Zell am See EK. He would return to Italy for the 1993–94 season to play for Hockey Club Varese. Playing in only seven games that year, including the playoffs, he scored two goals and three assists before deciding to retire from playing ice hockey and return to North America.

=== Later career and death ===
After returning from Europe, Trader was named head coach of the Brantford Smoke prior to the 1995–96 season. He coached the Smoke for three seasons, always with a winning record, but always getting knocked out in the second round of the playoffs. Trader officially retired from coaching after the 1997–98 season.

Trader died on September 4, 2024, at the age of 61.

== Career statistics ==
			Regular season					Playoffs
Season	Team	League	GP	G	A	Pts	PIM	GP	G	A	Pts	PIM
1979–80	Gloucester Rangers	CJHL	50	11	22	33	70	—	—	—	—	—
1980–81	London Knights	OHL	68	5	23	28	132	—	—	—	—	—
1981–82	London Knights	OHL	68	19	37	56	161	4	0	1	1	6
1982–83	London Knights	OHL	39	16	28	44	67	3	0	1	1	6
1982–83	Detroit Red Wings	NHL	15	0	2	2	6	—	—	—	—	—
1982–83	Adirondack Red Wings	AHL	6	2	2	4	4	6	2	1	3	10
1983–84	Adirondack Red Wings	AHL	80	13	28	41	89	6	1	1	2	4
1984–85	Detroit Red Wings	NHL	40	3	7	10	39	3	0	0	0	0
1984–85	Adirondack Red Wings	AHL	6	0	4	4	0	—	—	—	—	—
1985–86	Adirondack Red Wings	AHL	64	10	46	56	77	17	6	16	22	14
1986–87	St. Louis Blues	NHL	5	0	0	0	8	—	—	—	—	—
1987–88	St. Louis Blues	NHL	1	0	0	0	2	—	—	—	—	—
1987–88	Montreal Canadiens	NHL	30	2	4	6	19	—	—	—	—	—
1987–88	Sherbrooke Canadiens	AHL	11	2	2	4	25	—	—	—	—	—
1988–89	Binghamton Whalers	AHL	65	11	40	51	72	—	—	—	—	—
1989–90	Klagenfurter AC	Austria	35	12	22	34	79	—	—	—	—	—
1990–91	HC Bruneck	Italy	36	8	23	31	44	—	—	—	—	—
1991–92	HC Bruneck	Italy	18	2	12	14	29	3	1	4	5	2
1991–92	HC Bruneck	Alpenliga	18	3	13	16	56	—	—	—	—	—
1992–93	HC Bruneck	Italy	14	10	13	23	18	3	1	1	2	6
1992–93	HC Bruneck	Alpenliga	19	2	15	17	83	—	—	—	—	—
1992–93	EK Zell am See	Austria	4	1	1	2	8	—	—	—	—	—
1993–94	HC Varese	Italy	4	1	3	4	8	3	1	0	1	32
NHL totals			91	5	13	18	74	3	0	0	0	0
AHL totals			232	38	122	160	267	29	9	18	27	28

== Awards and achievements ==
- COJHL Best Midget-Age Player: 1979–80
- COJHL All-Star First Team: 1979–80
- World Junior Championships: 1983 (bronze medal)
- Named to AHL All-Star Second Team: 1985–86
- AHL Playoffs Points Leader: 1986 (22 points)
- AHL Playoffs Assists Leader: 1986 (16 assists)
- Won Calder Cup: 1986
