= Mike Rosati =

Canadian-born Italian ice hockey player

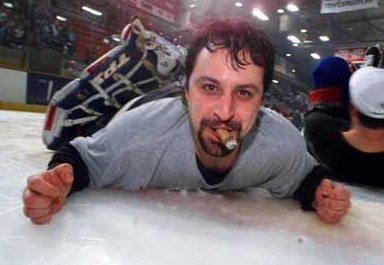
- Born: January 7, 1968 (age 58) Toronto, Ontario, Canada
- Height: 5 ft 8 in (173 cm)
- Weight: 171 lb (78 kg; 12 st 3 lb)
- Position: Goaltender
- Caught: Left
- Played for: Washington Capitals; HC Bolzano; Adler Mannheim
- National team: Italy
- NHL draft: 131st overall, 1988; New York Rangers
- Playing career: 1989–2004

Michael Anthony Rosati (born January 7, 1968) is a Canadian-born Italian former professional ice hockey player. He played one game in the National Hockey League with the Washington Capitals during the 1998–99 season. The rest of his career, which lasted from 1989 to 2004, was mainly spent in Europe. Internationally Rosati played for the Italian national team at the 1994 and 1998 Winter Olympics, and nine World Championships.

== Early years ==
As a youth, Rosati played in the 1981 Quebec International Pee-Wee Hockey Tournament with a minor ice hockey team from Wexford, Toronto.

Rosati started his career by playing in the Ontario Hockey League and was soon drafted by the New York Rangers in 1988 NHL entry draft (#131 pick). Rosati was initially placed in the ECHL, but after a disappointing season, decided to play in Italy. Rosati would find much more success there, and played for the Hockey Club Bolzano. In the 1990s Rosati would lead Bolzano to two Italian Hockey Championships, and would earn himself the place of goaltender for the Italian national team that would go on to compete in the 1994 and 1998 Winter Olympics.

== The 1990s and the NHL experience ==
By the second half of the 1990s, the Italian hockey movement had gone through a difficult period, and Rosati moved to Germany. It was here that Rosati played for Adler Mannheim of the DEL. In 1998, after two seasons of consistent play with Adler Mannheim, Rosati signed with the Washington Capitals as the third goaltender of the team, behind Olaf Kölzig and Rick Tabaracci and played for their minor league affiliate, the Portland Pirates. On November 7, 1998, the incumbent Capitals goalie, Olaf Kölzig, suffered an injury, and Rosati made his NHL debut against the Ottawa Senators in a match won by the Capitals 8–5. Rosati played 28 minutes and didn't allow a goal, making 12 saves. He finished the season with the Manitoba Moose of the IHL. Rosati returned to Mannheim where he played four more seasons.

== Retirement and coaching ==
Rosati retired in 2004 while playing for a German second division team. In the 2004–05 season, Rosati was the Adler Mannheim assistant coach and worked with Stéphane Richer and Helmut de Raaf (who played with Rosati for multiple seasons).

Rosati is currently the goaltending coach of the Vegas Golden Knights in the NHL. He enjoys spending time with his 2 daughters, Jessica and Alyssa, who are his biggest supporters. In the offseason, Rosati lives in Niagara Falls.

== Career statistics ==
=== Regular season and playoffs ===
| | | | Regular season | | | | | | | | | Playoffs |
| Season | Team | League | GP | W | L | T | MIN | GA | SO | GAA | SV% | GP | W | L | MIN | GA | SO | GAA | SV% |
|---|---|---|---|---|---|---|---|---|---|---|---|---|---|---|---|---|---|---|---|
| 1984–85 | St. Michael's Buzzers | MetJBHL | 19 | — | — | — | 1027 | 93 | 0 | 5.13 | — | — | — | — | — | — | — | — | — |
| 1985–86 | St. Michael's Buzzers | MetJBHL | 20 | 8 | 11 | 1 | 1100 | 95 | 0 | 5.18 | — | 34 | — | — | 1648 | 119 | 0 | 4.33 | — |
| 1985–86 | Hamilton Steelhawks | OHL | 1 | 0 | 0 | 1 | 70 | 5 | 0 | 4.29 | .878 | — | — | — | — | — | — | — | — |
| 1986–87 | Hamilton Steelhawks | OHL | 26 | 15 | 6 | 1 | 1334 | 85 | 1 | 3.82 | .886 | — | — | — | — | — | — | — | — |
| 1987–88 | Hamilton Steelhawks | OHL | 62 | 29 | 25 | 3 | 3468 | 233 | 1 | 4.03 | .879 | 14 | 8 | 6 | 833 | 66 | 0 | 4.75 | — |
| 1988–89 | Niagara Falls Thunder | OHL | 52 | 28 | 15 | 2 | 2339 | 174 | 1 | 4.46 | .867 | 16 | 10 | 4 | 861 | 62 | 0 | 4.32 | — |
| 1989–90 | Erie Panthers | ECHL | 18 | 12 | 5 | 0 | 1056 | 73 | 0 | 4.14 | .881 | — | — | — | — | — | — | — | — |
| 1990–91 | HC Bolzano | ITA | 46 | — | — | — | 2700 | 212 | 0 | 4.71 | — | — | — | — | — | — | — | — | — |
| 1991–92 | HC Bolzano | ITA | 18 | 11 | 6 | 1 | 1022 | 58 | 2 | 3.22 | — | 7 | 5 | 2 | 409 | 30 | 0 | 4.28 | — |
| 1992–93 | HC Bolzano | ITA | 26 | — | — | — | 1525 | 78 | 1 | 3.07 | — | — | — | — | — | — | — | — | — |
| 1993–94 | HC Bolzano | ITA | 29 | — | — | — | 1683 | 104 | 0 | 3.71 | — | — | — | — | — | — | — | — | — |
| 1994–95 | HC Bolzano | ITA | 47 | — | — | — | 2705 | 149 | 1 | 3.30 | — | — | — | — | — | — | — | — | — |
| 1995–96 | HC Bolzano | ITA | 45 | 36 | 5 | 3 | 2465 | 137 | 3 | 3.36 | .875 | — | — | — | — | — | — | — | — |
| 1996–97 | Adler Mannheim | DEL | 44 | — | — | — | 2625 | 104 | 6 | 2.38 | .905 | 9 | — | — | 514 | 24 | 0 | 2.80 | .884 |
| 1997–98 | Adler Mannheim | DEL | 43 | — | — | — | 2567 | 116 | 2 | 2.71 | .907 | 10 | 9 | 1 | 569 | 17 | 1 | 2.00 | .919 |
| 1998–99 | Washington Capitals | NHL | 1 | 1 | 0 | 0 | 28 | 0 | 0 | 0.00 | 1.000 | — | — | — | — | — | — | — | — |
| 1998–99 | Portland Pirates | AHL | 32 | 9 | 23 | 0 | 1783 | 111 | 1 | 3.74 | .883 | — | — | — | — | — | — | — | — |
| 1998–99 | Manitoba Moose | IHL | 8 | 5 | 1 | 2 | 479 | 16 | 1 | 2.00 | .937 | 5 | 2 | 3 | 314 | 18 | 0 | 3.44 | .890 |
| 1999–00 | Adler Mannheim | DEL | 55 | — | — | — | 3245 | 170 | 3 | 3.14 | .897 | 5 | — | — | 280 | 15 | 2 | 3.21 | .903 |
| 2000–01 | Adler Mannheim | DEL | 42 | — | — | — | 2392 | 90 | — | 2.26 | .914 | 12 | — | — | — | — | — | 2.33 | .921 |
| 2001–02 | Adler Mannheim | DEL | 51 | — | — | — | 2952 | 101 | — | 2.05 | .925 | 12 | — | — | — | — | — | 1.10 | .951 |
| 2002–03 | Adler Mannheim | DEL | 39 | — | — | — | 2204 | 85 | — | 2.31 | .916 | 8 | — | — | — | — | — | 2.88 | .898 |
| 2003–04 | Heilbronner Falken | GER-2 | 46 | — | — | — | — | — | — | 3.04 | — | — | — | — | — | — | — | — | — |
| NHL totals | | | 1 | 1 | 0 | 0 | 28 | 0 | 0 | 0.00 | 1.000 | — | — | — | — | — | — | — | — |

=== International ===
| Year | Team | Event | GP | W | L | T | MIN | GA | SO | GAA | SV% |
|---|---|---|---|---|---|---|---|---|---|---|---|
| 1994 | Italy | OLY | 2 | 0 | 0 | 0 | 31 | 4 | 0 | 7.85 | .762 |
| 1994 | Italy | WC | 4 | — | — | — | 240 | 14 | 0 | 3.50 | .899 |
| 1995 | Italy | WC | 3 | 2 | 0 | 0 | 133 | 3 | 0 | 1.35 | .972 |
| 1996 | Italy | WC | 2 | — | — | — | — | — | — | 6.00 | .907 |
| 1997 | Italy | WC | 4 | — | — | — | 238 | 12 | 0 | 3.01 | .925 |
| 1998 | Italy | OLY | 4 | 1 | 2 | 0 | 215 | 12 | 0 | 3.35 | .848 |
| 1998 | Italy | WC | 5 | — | — | — | — | — | 1 | 1.61 | .950 |
| 2000 | Italy | WC | 3 | 1 | 2 | 0 | 150 | 12 | 1 | 4.79 | .857 |
| 2001 | Italy | WC | 6 | — | — | — | 300 | 22 | 0 | 4.40 | .892 |
| 2002 | Italy | WC | 5 | — | — | — | 240 | 16 | 0 | 4.00 | .876 |
| 2003 | Italy | WC-I | 4 | — | — | — | 239 | 8 | 1 | 2.00 | .936 |
| Senior totals | | | 39 | — | — | — | — | — | — | — | — |

== See also ==
- List of players who played only one game in the NHL
