= Dave Pasin =

Canadian ice hockey player (born 1966)

- Born: July 8, 1966 (age 59) Edmonton, Alberta, Canada
- Height: 6 ft 2 in (188 cm)
- Weight: 215 lb (98 kg; 15 st 5 lb)
- Position: Centre
- Shot: Right
- Played for: Boston Bruins; Los Angeles Kings
- NHL draft: 19th overall, 1984; Boston Bruins
- Playing career: 1985–1997

David Pasin (born July 8, 1966) is a Canadian former professional ice hockey centre. He was drafted in the first round, 19th overall, by the Boston Bruins in the 1984 NHL entry draft.

Pasin played 76 games in the National Hockey League; 71 with the Bruins in the 1985–86 season and five with the Los Angeles Kings in the 1988–89 season.

== Career statistics ==
=== Regular season and playoffs ===
| | | | Regular season | | | | | Playoffs |
| Season | Team | League | GP | G | A | Pts | PIM | GP | G | A | Pts | PIM |
|---|---|---|---|---|---|---|---|---|---|---|---|---|
| 1982–83 | Prince Albert Raiders | WHL | 62 | 40 | 42 | 82 | 48 | — | — | — | — | — |
| 1983–84 | Prince Albert Raiders | WHL | 71 | 68 | 54 | 122 | 68 | 5 | 1 | 4 | 5 | 0 |
| 1984–85 | Prince Albert Raiders | WHL | 65 | 64 | 52 | 116 | 88 | 10 | 10 | 11 | 21 | 10 |
| 1985–86 | Boston Bruins | NHL | 71 | 18 | 19 | 37 | 50 | 3 | 0 | 1 | 1 | 0 |
| 1986–87 | Moncton Golden Flames | AHL | 66 | 27 | 25 | 52 | 47 | 6 | 1 | 1 | 2 | 14 |
| 1987–88 | Maine Mariners | AHL | 30 | 8 | 14 | 22 | 39 | 8 | 4 | 3 | 7 | 13 |
| 1988–89 | Maine Mariners | AHL | 11 | 2 | 5 | 7 | 6 | — | — | — | — | — |
| 1988–89 | Los Angeles Kings | NHL | 5 | 0 | 0 | 0 | 0 | — | — | — | — | — |
| 1988–89 | New Haven Nighthawks | AHL | 48 | 25 | 23 | 48 | 42 | 17 | 8 | 8 | 16 | 47 |
| 1989–90 | HC Fribourg–Gottéron | NDA | 9 | 4 | 7 | 11 | 17 | — | — | — | — | — |
| 1989–90 | New Haven Nighthawks | AHL | 7 | 7 | 4 | 11 | 14 | — | — | — | — | — |
| 1989–90 | Springfield Indians | AHL | 11 | 2 | 3 | 5 | 2 | 3 | 1 | 2 | 3 | 0 |
| 1990–91 | New Haven Nighthawks | AHL | 39 | 13 | 25 | 38 | 57 | — | — | — | — | — |
| 1990–91 | Phoenix Roadrunners | IHL | 13 | 4 | 3 | 7 | 24 | 9 | 3 | 4 | 7 | 8 |
| 1991–92 | HC Gherdëina | ITA-2 | 30 | 51 | 38 | 89 | 33 | — | — | — | — | — |
| 1992–93 | HC Bolzano | ITA | 32 | 31 | 46 | 77 | 52 | 8 | 4 | 5 | 9 | 7 |
| 1992–93 | HC Bolzano | AL | 18 | 12 | 12 | 24 | 100 | — | — | — | — | — |
| 1993–94 | HC Bolzano | ITA | 15 | 12 | 27 | 39 | 37 | 6 | 5 | 7 | 12 | 14 |
| 1993–94 | HC Bolzano | AL | 29 | 29 | 34 | 63 | 74 | — | — | — | — | — |
| 1994–95 | HC Bolzano | ITA | 32 | 31 | 46 | 77 | 52 | 10 | 12 | 19 | 31 | 28 |
| 1994–95 | HC Bolzano | AL | 18 | 20 | 25 | 45 | 38 | — | — | — | — | — |
| 1995–96 | San Francisco Spiders | IHL | 26 | 5 | 9 | 14 | 16 | — | — | — | — | — |
| 1996–97 | HC Bolzano | ITA | 39 | 23 | 28 | 51 | 127 | — | — | — | — | — |
| 1996–97 | HC Davos | NDA | 2 | 3 | 1 | 4 | 6 | 6 | 4 | 3 | 7 | 16 |
| 1997–98 | HC Thurgau | SU-2 | 9 | 3 | 8 | 11 | 64 | — | — | — | — | — |
| AHL totals | | | 212 | 84 | 99 | 183 | 207 | 34 | 14 | 14 | 28 | 74 |
| ITA totals | | | 118 | 97 | 147 | 244 | 268 | 24 | 21 | 31 | 52 | 49 |
| NHL totals | | | 76 | 18 | 19 | 37 | 50 | 3 | 0 | 1 | 1 | 0 |

== Roller hockey statistics ==
 --- Regular Season --- 
Season Team Lge GP G A Pts PIM 
-------------------------------------------------------
1996 Oakland Skates RHI 6 3 2 5 6
-------------------------------------------------------

== Awards ==
- WHL East Second All-Star Team – 1984 & 1985

| Preceded by Nevin Markwart | Boston Bruins first-round draft pick 1984 | Succeeded by Craig Janney |
