= Murray Eaves =

Canadian ice hockey player

Murray James Eaves
- Born: May 10, 1960 (age 64); Calgary, Alberta, Canada
- Height: 5 ft 10 in (178 cm)
- Weight: 185 lb (84 kg; 13 st 3 lb)
- Position: Centre
- Shot: Right
- Played for: Winnipeg Jets; Detroit Red Wings
- NHL draft: 44th overall, 1980; Winnipeg Jets
- Playing career: 1980–1995

Murray James Eaves (born May 10, 1960) is a Canadian former professional ice hockey player who played 57 games in the National Hockey League. He played with the Winnipeg Jets and Detroit Red Wings. He now coaches Bantam Tier 1 hockey and lacrosse at Shattuck - St. Mary's school in Faribault, Minnesota. His son, Tyler Eaves, played hockey at Rensselaer Polytechnic Institute. Murray is the brother of the NHL hockey player, Mike Eaves. He was born in Calgary, Alberta.

== Career statistics ==
| | | | Regular season | | | | | Playoffs |
| Season | Team | League | GP | G | A | Pts | PIM | GP | G | A | Pts | PIM |
|---|---|---|---|---|---|---|---|---|---|---|---|---|
| 1977–78 | Windsor Spitfires | OMJHL | 3 | 0 | 0 | 0 | 0 | — | — | — | — | — |
| 1978–79 | University of Michigan | NCAA | 23 | 12 | 22 | 34 | 14 | — | — | — | — | — |
| 1979–80 | University of Michigan | NCAA | 33 | 36 | 49 | 85 | 35 | — | — | — | — | — |
| 1980–81 | Tulsa Oilers | CHL | 59 | 24 | 34 | 58 | 59 | 8 | 5 | 5 | 10 | 13 |
| 1980–81 | Winnipeg Jets | NHL | 12 | 1 | 2 | 3 | 5 | — | — | — | — | — |
| 1981–82 | Tulsa Oilers | CHL | 68 | 30 | 48 | 78 | 33 | 3 | 0 | 2 | 2 | 0 |
| 1981–82 | Winnipeg Jets | NHL | 2 | 0 | 0 | 0 | 0 | — | — | — | — | — |
| 1982–83 | Sherbrooke Jets | AHL | 40 | 24 | 34 | 58 | 16 | — | — | — | — | — |
| 1982–83 | Winnipeg Jets | NHL | 26 | 2 | 7 | 9 | 2 | — | — | — | — | — |
| 1983–84 | Sherbrooke Jets | AHL | 78 | 47 | 68 | 115 | 40 | — | — | — | — | — |
| 1983–84 | Winnipeg Jets | NHL | 2 | 0 | 0 | 0 | 0 | 2 | 0 | 0 | 0 | 2 |
| 1984–85 | Sherbrooke Canadiens | AHL | 47 | 26 | 42 | 68 | 28 | 15 | 5 | 13 | 18 | 35 |
| 1984–85 | Winnipeg Jets | NHL | 3 | 0 | 3 | 3 | 0 | 2 | 0 | 1 | 1 | 0 |
| 1985–86 | Sherbrooke Canadiens | AHL | 68 | 22 | 51 | 73 | 26 | — | — | — | — | — |
| 1985–86 | Winnipeg Jets | NHL | 4 | 1 | 0 | 1 | 0 | — | — | — | — | — |
| 1986–87 | Nova Scotia Oilers | AHL | 76 | 26 | 38 | 64 | 46 | 4 | 1 | 1 | 2 | 2 |
| 1987–88 | Adirondack Red Wings | AHL | 65 | 39 | 54 | 93 | 65 | 11 | 3 | 11 | 14 | 8 |
| 1987–88 | Detroit Red Wings | NHL | 7 | 0 | 1 | 1 | 2 | — | — | — | — | — |
| 1988–89 | Adirondack Red Wings | AHL | 80 | 46 | 72 | 118 | 84 | 16 | 13 | 12 | 25 | 10 |
| 1989–90 | Adirondack Red Wings | AHL | 78 | 40 | 49 | 89 | 35 | 6 | 2 | 3 | 5 | 2 |
| 1989–90 | Detroit Red Wings | NHL | 1 | 0 | 0 | 0 | 0 | — | — | — | — | — |
| 1990–91 | HC Varese | Italy | 32 | 22 | 37 | 59 | 23 | 10 | 9 | 9 | 18 | 4 |
| 1991–92 | HC Varese | Italy | 18 | 12 | 32 | 44 | 9 | 8 | 5 | 11 | 16 | 36 |
| 1991–92 | EHC Kloten | NLA | 4 | 2 | 3 | 5 | 2 | — | — | — | — | — |
| 1992–93 | EK Zell am See | Austria | — | — | — | — | — | — | — | — | — | — |
| 1992–93 | HC Devils Milano | Italy | 16 | 12 | 31 | 43 | 6 | 11 | 5 | 8 | 13 | 2 |
| 1992–93 | HC Devils Milano | Alpenliga | 4 | 1 | 2 | 3 | 0 | — | — | — | — | — |
| 1993–94 | EC Hannover | Germany2 | 31 | 16 | 25 | 41 | 23 | — | — | — | — | — |
| 1994–95 | Adirondack Red Wings | AHL | 4 | 0 | 1 | 1 | 0 | — | — | — | — | — |
| 1994–95 | Houston Aeros | IHL | 31 | 3 | 9 | 12 | 18 | — | — | — | — | — |
| NHL totals | | | 57 | 4 | 13 | 17 | 9 | 4 | 0 | 1 | 1 | 2 |
| AHL totals | | | 536 | 270 | 409 | 679 | 340 | 52 | 24 | 40 | 64 | 57 |

== Awards and honors ==
| Award | Year |
|---|---|
| All-WCHA Second Team | 1979–80 |
| AHCA West All-American | 1979–80 |
