= Bob Nardella =

Italian-American ice hockey player

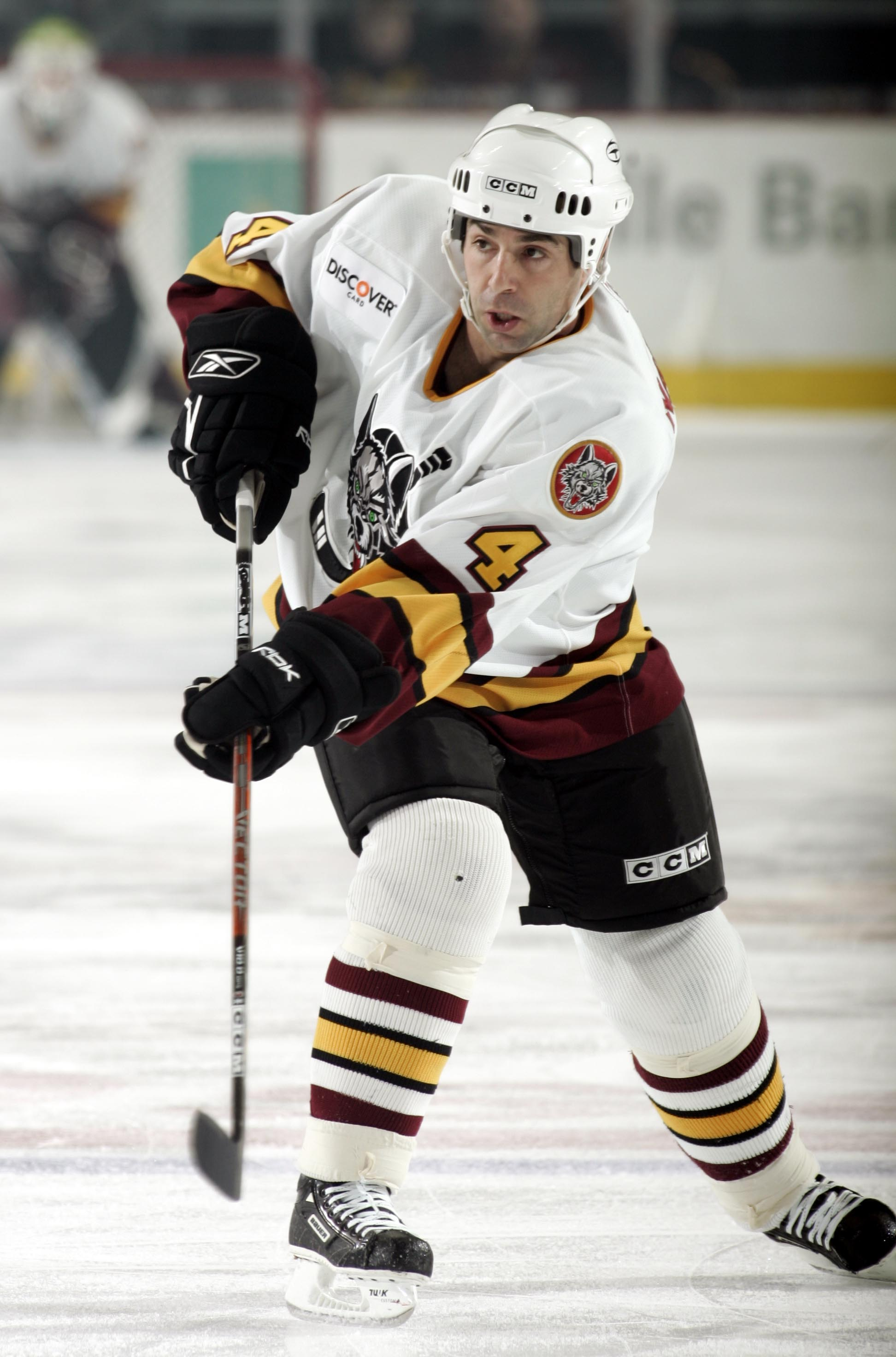
- Nardella with the Chicago Wolves in 2006
- Born: February 2, 1968 (age 57); Melrose Park, Illinois, U.S.
- Height: 5 ft 8 in (173 cm)
- Weight: 170 lb (77 kg; 12 st 2 lb)
- Position: Defense
- Shot: Right
- Played for: Alleghe Hockey; Chicago Wolves; Adler Mannheim; Quad City Mallards; Milano Vipers; Rockford IceHogs
- National team: Italy
- Playing career: 1991–2006
- Coaching career: 2012–present

Robert Nardella, Jr (born February 2, 1968) is an Italian-American former professional ice hockey defenseman who is the former head coach of the Chicago Wolves of the American Hockey League (AHL).

Following his NCAA career with Ferris State University, Nardella competed in the Italian Hockey League, Deutsche Eishockey Liga, International Hockey League, and American Hockey League. During his career, he played for the Alleghe Hockey, Chicago Wolves, Adler Mannheim, Quad City Mallards, Milano Vipers, and Rockford IceHogs. Nardella spent the majority of his professional career playing with the Chicago Wolves, where he set a franchise record for most points by a defenseman with 298. He also helped them win the International Hockey League’s Turner Cup in 1998 and 2000 and the American Hockey League’s Calder Cup in 2002.

Nardella has represented Italy internationally at the 1998 Winter Olympics and 2006 Winter Olympics, as well as at the 1995, 1996, and 1997 Men's World Ice Hockey Championships.

== Playing career ==
As a youth, Nardella played Minor ice hockey for the Chicago Jesters. Nardella later attended Holy Cross High School for two years before completing his junior and senior high school years in Iowa while playing with the Des Moines Buccaneers in the United States Hockey League. While with the Buccaneers, Nardella set a franchise record for most points scored in a season with 111 points during the 1987–88 season.

As a college walk-on for Ferris State University, Nardella played three seasons with the Bulldogs putting up 74 points in 108 games. In his last season with the team, Nardella transitioned into a defensive position, on the encouragement of coach Bob Mancini, and had a breakout year, putting up 40 points in 42 games. While this was not enough to attract attention from National Hockey League scouts, he was recruited by Italian third division teams. Due to his grandfather's Italian nationality, Nardella qualified for those teams as a national member. Nardella joined the HC Alta Badia for the 1991-92 season. He was then moved to the top tier Italian Hockey League team, Alleghe Hockey, for the next two seasons.

Nardella then joined the Chicago Wolves for their inaugural season in the International Hockey League. During this time, Nardella competed in the 1995 Men's World Ice Hockey Championships. He was also later named to Italy's 1996, and 1997 Men's World Ice Hockey Championships roster. In 1998, Nardella was selected by the Team Italy for the 1998 Winter Olympics before returning to the Wolves.

Nardella won the 2000 Turner Cup Championship with the Wolves, while leading all defensemen with 13 points. As a result of his play, Nardella was named to the IHL Second All-Star Team. He re-signed with the Wolves after that season. Following the 2001 Turner Cup, the Chicago Wolves and five other IHL teams were absorbed into the American Hockey League. That season the Wolves won the 2002 Calder Cup, with Nardella accumulating 14 points. After six consecutive seasons with the Wolves spanning from 1997 until 2003, Nardella was released by the team on January 28, 2003, and he subsequently joined the Milano Vipers in Italy and played two games for the Quad City Mallards in the UHL. While with the Vipers, Nardella helped them win the Italian Elite League Championship by scoring nine points in 11 games. He re-joined the Wolves on March 17, 2004. Nardella ended his career with the Wolves as the franchise record holder for most points by a defensemen with 298 points.

While playing with the Rockford IceHogs in the 2005–06 season, Nardella was again selected to represent Italy at the 2006 Winter Olympics. He retired after that season on April 21, 2006.

== Coaching career ==
In 2012, the Chicago Wolves hired Nardella to be the team's skills development coach. On December 15, 2012, Nardella was inducted into the Illinois Hockey Hall of Fame. In 2014, he became a part time coaching assistant until he was promoted to full time assistant coach in 2017. On June 13, 2023, he was promoted to head coach.

In 2023, Nardella was suspended ten games by the AHL for allegedly using homophobic language against officials.

== Personal life ==
Although Nardella was born in the United States, due to his grandfather's Italian heritage he was able to represent Italy internationally. Because Nardella played in Italy for a few seasons, he earned Italian citizenship.

While Nardella comes from a hockey involved family, he also encouraged his sons to become hockey players as well. His uncle Mike worked for the Chicago Blackhawks organization and his cousin Frank played NCAA hockey for Dartmouth College. While living in Rosemont with his wife Alicia, Nardella's elder son Bobby played NCAA hockey for the University of Notre Dame and his younger son Nicholas played in the North American Hockey League.

== Career statistics ==
=== Regular season and playoffs ===
			Regular season					Playoffs
Season	Team	League	GP	G	A	Pts	PIM	GP	G	A	Pts	PIM
1986–87	Des Moines Buccaneers	USHL
1987–88	Des Moines Buccaneers	USHL		44	67	111		—	—	—	—	—
1988–89	Ferris State University	CCHA	28	6	4	10	18	—	—	—	—	—
1989–90	Ferris State University	CCHA	38	10	14	24	46	—	—	—	—	—
1990–91	Ferris State University	CCHA	42	12	28	40	31	—	—	—	—	—
1991–92	HC Alta Badia	ITA.2	45	45	60	105	31	—	—	—	—	—
1992–93	Alleghe Hockey	ITA	16	10	9	19	4	9	6	11	17	8
1992–93	Alleghe Hockey	AL	32	19	37	56	18	—	—	—	—	—
1993–94	Alleghe Hockey	ITA	23	12	21	33	26	—	—	—	—	—
1993–94	Alleghe Hockey	AL	30	13	36	49	36	—	—	—	—	—
1994–95	Chicago Wolves	IHL	74	9	40	49	36	3	1	2	3	0
1995–96	HC Milano	ITA	30	14	31	45	31	13	2	4	6	60
1995–96	HC Milano	AL	8	4	3	7	8	—	—	—	—	—
1996–97	Adler Mannheim	DEL	50	6	21	27	59	9	3	6	9	10
1997–98	Chicago Wolves	IHL	65	13	35	48	40	22	5	13	18	24
1998–99	Chicago Wolves	IHL	82	8	45	53	86	10	0	2	2	6
1999–2000	Chicago Wolves	IHL	77	10	36	46	26	16	2	11	13	10
2000–01	Chicago Wolves	IHL	78	9	40	49	58	16	3	4	7	34
2001–02	Chicago Wolves	AHL	52	8	18	26	47	24	5	9	14	12
2002–03	Chicago Wolves	AHL	15	1	9	10	18	—	—	—	—	—
2002–03	Quad City Mallards	UHL	2	2	1	3	2	—	—	—	—	—
2002–03	HC Milano	ITA	11	1	8	9	10	9	1	6	7	19
2003–04	Rockford IceHogs	UHL	44	7	38	45	82	—	—	—	—	—
2003–04	Chicago Wolves	AHL	13	0	10	10	6	10	1	3	4	12
2005–06	Chicago Wolves	AHL	20	1	6	7	14	—	—	—	—	—
2005–06	Rockford IceHogs	UHL	26	3	19	22	18	—	—	—	—	—
ITA totals			80	37	69	106	71	31	9	21	30	86
IHL totals			376	49	196	245	246	67	11	32	43	74
AHL totals			100	10	43	53	85	34	6	12	18	24

=== International ===
Year	Team	Event	Result	GP	G	A	Pts	PIM
1995	Italy	WC	7th	5	0	1	1	8
1996	Italy	WC	7th	4	2	2	4	0
1997	Italy	WC	8th	8	3	3	6	8
1998	Italy	OG	12th	4	0	2	2	6
2006	Italy	OG	11th	5	0	1	1	6
Senior totals				26	5	9	14	28

== Awards and honors ==
Award	Year	Ref
USHL
USHL Forward of the Year	1988	
IHL
IHL Second All-Star Team	2000	
Turner Cup	1998, 2000	
AHL
Calder Cup Champion	2002	
