= Mikhail Vasiliev =

Russian ice hockey player (1962–2026)

- Born: 8 June 1962 Elektrogorsk, Moscow Oblast, Russian SFSR, Soviet Union
- Died: 5 November 2026 (aged 64) Moscow, Russia
- Height: 6 ft 0 in (183 cm)
- Weight: 185 lb (84 kg; 13 st 3 lb)
- Position: Left wing
- Shot: Left
- Played for: HC CSKA Moscow; Torpedo Yaroslavl; HC Varese; EHC Chur; HC Bolzano; Rødovre Mighty Bulls
- National team: Soviet Union
- Playing career: 1979–2001

Mikhail Aleksandrovich Vasiliev (Russian: Михаил Александрович Васильев; 8 June 1962 – 5 November 2026) was a Soviet ice hockey player who played in the Soviet Hockey League. He played for Torpedo Yaroslavl and HC CSKA Moscow in the Soviet Union, and for HC Selva, EV Bozen 84, AS Mastini Varese Hockey and HC Bolzano in Italy. Vasiliev played for a season (1997–98) in Denmark for Rødovre IK, too. He was inducted into the Russian and Soviet Hockey Hall of Fame in 1983. Vasiliev died on 5 November 2026, at the age of 64.

== Career statistics ==
=== Regular season and playoffs ===
			Regular season					Playoffs
Season	Team	League	GP	G	A	Pts	PIM	GP	G	A	Pts	PIM
1979–80	CSKA Moscow	USSR	1	1	0	1	0	—	—	—	—	—
1980–81	CSKA Moscow	USSR	20	1	1	2	6	—	—	—	—	—
1981–82	CSKA Moscow	USSR	45	12	13	25	24	—	—	—	—	—
1982–83	CSKA Moscow	USSR	34	16	14	30	28	—	—	—	—	—
1983–84	CSKA Moscow	USSR	38	11	12	23	10	—	—	—	—	—
1984–85	CSKA Moscow	USSR	23	4	4	8	4	—	—	—	—	—
1985–86	CSKA Moscow	USSR	33	10	5	15	14	—	—	—	—	—
1986–87	CSKA Moscow	USSR	34	16	11	27	26	—	—	—	—	—
1987–88	CSKA Moscow	USSR	22	6	8	14	14	—	—	—	—	—
1988–89	CSKA Moscow	USSR	10	0	1	1	2	—	—	—	—	—
1989–90	Torpedo Yaroslavl	USSR	39	20	8	28	28	—	—	—	—	—
1990–91	HC Selva	ITA II	36	55	55	110	43	—	—	—	—	—
1991–92	HC Selva	ITA II	26	31	43	74	10	—	—	—	—	—
1992–93	HC Varese	ITA	16	12	12	24	0	3	1	3	4	0
1993–94	HC Varese	ITA	25	13	16	29	46	—	—	—	—	—
1994–95	Torpedo Yaroslavl	IHL	7	0	4	4	8	—	—	—	—	—
1994–95	EV Bozen 84	ITA II	18	34	18	52	8	10	11	10	21	6
1995–96	EV Bozen 84	ITA II	36	49	39	88	4	2	3	1	4	0
1996–97	HC Bolzano	ITA	37	18	28	46	22	—	—	—	—	—
1997–98	HC Bolzano	ITA	9	3	4	7	2	—	—	—	—	—
1997–98	Rødovre Mighty Bulls	DNK	39	18	18	36	65	—	—	—	—	—
1998–99	HC Bolzano	ITA	15	5	8	13	6	—	—	—	—	—
1999–2000	HC Bolzano	ITA	2	1	3	4	4	—	—	—	—	—
2000–01	HC Bolzano	ITA	32	8	23	31	18	6	0	4	4	4
USSR totals			299	99	77	174	156	—	—	—	—	—
ITA II totals			116	169	155	324	65	12	14	11	25	6
ITA totals			136	60	94	154	98	9	1	7	8	4

=== International ===
Year	Team	Event	GP	G	A	Pts	PIM
1982	Soviet Union	WJC	7	5	3	8	13
1983	Soviet Union	WC	9	3	4	7	6
1984	Soviet Union	OG	7	3	2	5	4
1984	Soviet Union	CC	4	1	1	2	0
1985	Soviet Union	WC	7	3	4	7	2
1987	Soviet Union	WC	10	1	2	3	11
Senior totals			37	11	13	24	23
