= Tom Tilley (ice hockey) =

Canadian ice hockey player (born 1965)

- Born: March 28, 1965 (age 61) Trenton, Ontario, Canada
- Height: 6 ft 0 in (183 cm)
- Weight: 190 lb (86 kg; 13 st 8 lb)
- Position: Defence
- Shot: Right
- Played for: St. Louis Blues; HC Milano Saima
- National team: Canada
- NHL draft: 196th overall, 1984; St. Louis Blues
- Playing career: 1988–2001
Medal record
Men's ice hockey
Representing Canada
World Championships
Bronze medal – third place	1995 Sweden	Ice hockey

Thomas R. Tilley (born March 28, 1965) is a Canadian retired professional hockey player. He played 174 games in the National Hockey League with the St. Louis Blues from 1988 to 1994. The rest of his career, which lasted from 1988 to 2001, was mainly spent in the minor leagues. He played defense and shot right-handed.

== Career ==
Tilley was drafted by the Blues in the 10th round, 196th overall in the 1984 NHL entry draft. After being drafted, he played for Michigan State for four years, where he developed a strong defensive presence. Immediately after college, Tilley joined the Blues and played his only full season in the NHL during the 1988–1989 season, scoring 23 points. Tilley then bounced between the Blues and their IHL affiliate Peoria Rivermen for the next two years before playing in Italy for Devils Milano for another two years. Tilley returned to the Blues in the 1993–1994, appearing in 48 games. He spent rest of his career in the IHL, retiring after the 2000–2001 season with the Chicago Wolves.

== Personal life ==
Tilley lives in the Kansas City metropolitan area and helps coach youth hockey.

== Career statistics ==
=== Regular season and playoffs ===
			Regular season					Playoffs
Season	Team	League	GP	G	A	Pts	PIM	GP	G	A	Pts	PIM
1982–83	Orillia Travelways	OJAHL	42	6	13	19	77	—	—	—	—	—
1983–84	Orillia Travelways	OJAHL	38	16	35	51	113	—	—	—	—	—
1984–85	Michigan State University	CCHA	37	1	5	6	58	—	—	—	—	—
1985–86	Michigan State University	CCHA	42	9	25	34	48	—	—	—	—	—
1986–87	Michigan State University	CCHA	42	7	14	21	48	—	—	—	—	—
1987–88	Michigan State University	CCHA	46	8	18	26	44	—	—	—	—	—
1988–89	St. Louis Blues	NHL	70	1	22	23	47	10	1	2	3	17
1989–90	St. Louis Blues	NHL	34	0	5	5	6	—	—	—	—	—
1989–90	Peoria Rivermen	IHL	22	1	8	9	13	—	—	—	—	—
1990–91	St. Louis Blues	NHL	22	2	4	6	4	—	—	—	—	—
1990–91	Peoria Rivermen	IHL	48	7	38	45	53	13	2	9	11	25
1991–92	HC Devils Milano	ITA	18	7	13	20	12	12	5	12	17	10
1991–92	HC Devils Milano	ALP	20	3	12	15	26	—	—	—	—	—
1991–92	Canadian National Team	Intl	4	0	1	1	0	—	—	—	—	—
1992–93	HC Devils Milano	ITA	14	8	3	11	2	8	1	5	6	4
1992–93	HC Devils Milano	ALP	32	5	17	22	21	—	—	—	—	—
1993–94	St. Louis Blues	NHL	48	1	7	8	32	4	0	1	1	2
1994–95	Atlanta Knights	IHL	10	2	6	8	14	—	—	—	—	—
1994–95	Indianapolis Ice	IHL	25	2	13	15	19	—	—	—	—	—
1995–96	Milwaukee Admirals	IHL	80	11	68	79	58	4	2	2	4	4
1996–97	Milwaukee Admirals	IHL	25	1	10	11	8	3	0	1	1	0
1997–98	Chicago Wolves	IHL	73	9	49	58	49	22	2	17	19	14
1998–99	Chicago Wolves	IHL	73	5	55	60	32	10	1	1	2	2
1999–00	Chicago Wolves	IHL	75	2	34	36	42	12	1	6	7	6
2000–01	Chicago Wolves	IHL	10	1	3	4	10	—	—	—	—	—
IHL totals			441	41	284	325	298	64	8	36	44	51
NHL totals			174	4	38	42	89	14	1	3	4	19

=== International ===
Year	Team	Event	GP	G	A	Pts	PIM
1995	Canada	WC	8	0	0	0	14
Senior totals			8	0	0	0	14
