= Frank Caprice =

Canadian ice hockey player (1962–2025)

- Born: May 2, 1962 Hamilton, Ontario, Canada
- Died: May 7, 2025 (aged 63) Burlington, Ontario, Canada
- Height: 5 ft 11 in (180 cm)
- Weight: 150 lb (68 kg; 10 st 10 lb)
- Position: Goaltender
- Caught: Left
- Played for: Vancouver Canucks
- NHL draft: 178th overall, 1981; Vancouver Canucks
- Playing career: 1982–1999

Francis J. Caprice (May 2, 1962 – May 7, 2025) was a Canadian professional ice hockey goaltender who spent parts of six seasons with the Vancouver Canucks of the National Hockey League from 1983 to 1988. After his time with the Canucks, Caprice played for several years in Europe, before retiring in 1999.

== Biography ==
Caprice was born in Hamilton, Ontario on May 2, 1962. He was Vancouver's ninth-round selection (178th overall) in the 1981 NHL entry draft. In the year following his selection, he improved his stock greatly, winning 24 games for the London Knights and representing Canada at the 1982 World Junior Championships. He won all three of his starts at the World Juniors, helping Canada to the gold medal. Following the season, he signed with the Canucks and turned pro.

Caprice spent most of his first pro season in the AHL, although he did make his NHL debut, playing the 3rd period in a blowout to the Los Angeles Kings. Caprice's big opportunity came in the 1983–84 when the Canucks' starting goalie Richard Brodeur was injured. In his starting debut against the Edmonton Oilers on Hockey Night in Canada, Caprice earned first-star honours in a 3-2 Canucks victory. He posted a solid 8-8-1 mark with a 3.34 GAA, the best performance of any of the three Canuck goalies that year.

Based on his fine performance in 1983–84, Caprice was given a chance to usurp Brodeur as the Canucks' starter in 1984–85, although he struggled and then tore his hamstring, causing him to miss three months of action. He finished the season with an 8-14-3 mark and 4.81 GAA in 28 appearances, and never seriously challenged for the #1 spot again.

In 1985–86, Caprice again struggled, posting an 0-3-2 record and a terrible 5.45 GAA in 7 appearances, and was demoted to the AHL in favour of Wendell Young. However, he reclaimed the backup job in 1986–87, and posted a 3.84 GAA in 25 appearances, his best since his rookie year. In 1987–88, he appeared in 22 games backing up 21-year-old Kirk McLean as the aging Brodeur was relegated to 11 appearances.

In 1988–89, Caprice was relegated to the IHL as the Canucks decided to go with a goaltending tandem of McLean and Steve Weeks. For the 1989–90 season, Caprice was dealt to the Boston Bruins for a ninth-round pick. However, he spent the entire season in the minors and was released at the end of the year.

Following his release from the Bruins, Caprice spent most of the 1990s playing in Italy and later in Britain with the Cardiff Devils, before retiring in 1999 and returning to his hometown of Hamilton. He came out of retirement in 2001 to represent the Dundas, Ontario team at the 2001 Allan Cup.

In 1993, Caprice played for the Vancouver VooDoo of Roller Hockey International.

Caprice appeared in 102 NHL games over 6 NHL seasons, posting a 31-46-11 record with a 4.19 GAA and one shutout.

Caprice died on May 7, 2025, at the age of 63.

== Career statistics ==
=== Regular season and playoffs ===
			Regular season									Playoffs
Season	Team	League	GP	W	L	T	MIN	GA	SO	GAA	SV%	GP	W	L	MIN	GA	SO	GAA	SV%
1979–80	London Knights	OMJHL	18	3	7	3	919	74	1	4.84	—	3	1	1	94	10	0	4.50	—
1980–81	London Knights	OHL	42	11	26	0	2171	190	0	5.25	—	—	—	—	—	—	—	—	—
1981–82	London Knights	OHL	45	24	17	2	2614	196	0	4.50	—	4	1	3	240	18	0	4.50	—
1981–82	Dallas Black Hawks	CHL	3	0	3	0	178	19	0	6.40	—	—	—	—	—	—	—	—	—
1982–83	Vancouver Canucks	NHL	1	0	0	0	19	3	0	9.52	.625	—	—	—	—	—	—	—	—
1982–83	Fredericton Express	AHL	14	5	8	1	819	50	0	3.67	—	—	—	—	—	—	—	—	—
1983–84	Vancouver Canucks	NHL	19	8	8	2	1094	62	1	3.40	.882	—	—	—	—	—	—	—	—
1983–84	Fredericton Express	AHL	18	11	5	2	1089	49	2	2.70	—	—	—	—	—	—	—	—	—
1984–85	Vancouver Canucks	NHL	28	8	14	3	1513	122	0	4.84	.850	—	—	—	—	—	—	—	—
1985–86	Vancouver Canucks	NHL	7	0	3	2	308	28	0	5.46	.819	—	—	—	—	—	—	—	—
1985–86	Fredericton Express	AHL	26	12	11	2	1526	109	0	4.29	—	6	2	4	333	22	0	3.96	—
1986–87	Vancouver Canucks	NHL	25	8	11	2	1386	88	0	3.81	.863	—	—	—	—	—	—	—	—
1986–87	Fredericton Express	AHL	12	5	5	0	686	47	0	4.11	—	—	—	—	—	—	—	—	—
1987–88	Vancouver Canucks	NHL	22	7	10	2	1246	87	0	4.19	.861	—	—	—	—	—	—	—	—
1988–89	Milwaukee Admirals	IHL	39	24	12	0	2204	143	2	3.89	—	2	0	1	91	5	0	3.30	—
1989–90	Maine Mariners	AHL	10	2	6	1	550	46	0	5.02	—	—	—	—	—	—	—	—	—
1989–90	Milwaukee Admirals	IHL	20	8	6	3	1098	78	0	4.26	—	3	0	2	142	10	0	4.23	—
1992–93	HC Gardena	ITA	19	—	—	—	1140	93	—	4.89	—	—	—	—	—	—	—	—	—
1993–94	HC Gardena	ITA	22	—	—	—	1204	100	—	4.98	—	—	—	—	—	—	—	—	—
1994–95	HC Gardena	ITA	10	—	—	—	—	—	—	—	—	—	—	—	—	—	—	—	—
1995–96	HC Gardena	ITA	36	—	—	—	1678	100	—	3.58	—	—	—	—	—	—	—	—	—
1996–97	Cardiff Devils	BISL	7	7	0	0	430	14	1	1.95	—	1	—	—	60	3	0	3.00	—
1997–98	Cardiff Devils	BISL	8	—	—	—	480	16	1	2.00	—	2	—	—	120	4	—	2.00	—
1994–95	HC Gardena	ITA	10	—	—	—	—	—	—	—	—	—	—	—	—	—	—	—	—
1998–99	Corpus Christi IceRays	WPHL	15	9	5	1	847	48	0	3.40	.883	—	—	—	—	—	—	—	—
1998–99	Ayr Scottish Eagles	BISL	7	2	5	0	391	24	0	3.49	—	4	0	3	210	11	0	3.14	—
NHL totals			102	31	46	11	5567	390	1	4.20	.859	—	—	—	—	—	—	—	—
