= Ray Podloski =

Canadian ice hockey player

- Born: January 5, 1966 Edmonton, Alberta, Canada
- Died: May 29, 2018 (aged 52) Edmonton, Alberta, Canada
- Height: 6 ft 2 in (188 cm)
- Weight: 210 lb (95 kg; 15 st 0 lb)
- Position: Centre
- Shot: Left
- Played for: Boston Bruins
- National team: Canada and Austria
- NHL draft: 40th overall, 1984; Boston Bruins
- Playing career: 1986–2005

Raymond Sidney Podloski (January 5, 1966 – May 29, 2018) was a Canadian-Austrian professional ice hockey player. He played eight games in the National Hockey League with the Boston Bruins during the 1988–89 season. The rest of his career, which lasted from 1986 to 2005, was mainly spent in Europe. Internationally Podloski played for the Canadian national team for a time, before gaining Austrian citizenship and playing for the Austrian national team at the 1999 World Championship.

Podloski died of complications from a heart attack in 2018 at the age of 52.

== Career statistics ==
=== Regular season and playoffs ===
			Regular season					Playoffs
Season	Team	League	GP	G	A	Pts	PIM	GP	G	A	Pts	PIM
1982–83	Red Deer Rustlers	AJHL	59	49	48	97	47	1	0	0	0	2
1982–83	Portland Winterhawks	WHL	2	0	1	1	0	1	0	0	0	2
1982–83	Portland Winterhawks	M-Cup	—	—	—	—	—	1	0	0	0	0
1983–84	Portland Winterhawks	WHL	66	46	50	96	44	14	8	14	22	14
1984–85	Portland Winterhawks	WHL	67	63	75	138	41	6	3	1	4	7
1985–86	Portland Winterhawks	WHL	66	59	75	134	68	7	1	9	10	8
1985–86	Portland Winterhawks	M-Cup	—	—	—	—	—	4	2	5	7	2
1986–87	Moncton Golden Flames	AHL	70	23	27	50	12	3	0	0	0	15
1987–88	Maine Mariners	AHL	36	12	20	32	12	5	1	2	3	19
1988–89	Boston Bruins	NHL	8	0	1	1	17	—	—	—	—	—
1988–89	Maine Mariners	AHL	71	20	34	54	70	—	—	—	—	—
1989–90	Canadian National Team	Intl	58	18	16	34	38	—	—	—	—	—
1990–91	EHC 80 Nürnberg	GER-2	34	45	44	89	38	18	14	21	35	20
1991–92	EHC 80 Nürnberg	GER-2	41	31	48	79	64	—	—	—	—	—
1992–93	Klagenfurter AC	AUT	49	35	50	85	—	—	—	—	—	—
1993–94	HC Bolzano	ITA	17	13	21	34	43	8	1	4	5	5
1993–94	HC Bolzano	ALP	26	14	16	30	6	—	—	—	—	—
1994–95	EHC Lustenau	AUT	23	21	10	31	28	—	—	—	—	—
1994–95	Asiago	ITA	6	7	8	15	2	2	3	3	6	0
1995–96	EHC Lustenau	AUT	33	25	38	63	20	—	—	—	—	—
1996–97	EHC Lustenau	AUT-2	24	47	47	94	2	—	—	—	—	—
1996–97	EC Kapfenberg	AUT	5	5	4	9	2	—	—	—	—	—
1997–98	EC Kapfenberg	AUT	10	7	3	10	2	—	—	—	—	—
1997–98	Kassel Huskies	DEL	18	10	7	17	16	4	0	1	1	2
1998–99	Villacher SV	AUT	56	32	39	71	10	—	—	—	—	—
1999–00	Vojens IK	DEN	25	18	11	29	18	6	1	0	1	2
2000–01	EHC Lustenau	AUT	32	21	44	65	28	—	—	—	—	—
2001–02	EHC Lustenau	AUT	27	19	21	40	45	5	2	2	4	0
2002–03	Black Wings Linz	AUT	42	11	29	40	30	10	2	4	6	4
2003–04	Vienna Capitals	EBEL	41	9	20	29	26	—	—	—	—	—
2004–05	Vienna Capitals	EBEL	48	8	19	27	28	2	0	0	0	0
AUT/EBEL totals			366	193	277	470	219	17	4	6	10	4
NHL totals			8	0	1	1	17	—	—	—	—	—

=== International ===
Year	Team	Event	GP	G	A	Pts	PIM
1999	Austria	WC	6	1	0	1	2
Senior totals			6	1	0	1	2
