= Ray McKay =

Canadian ice hockey player

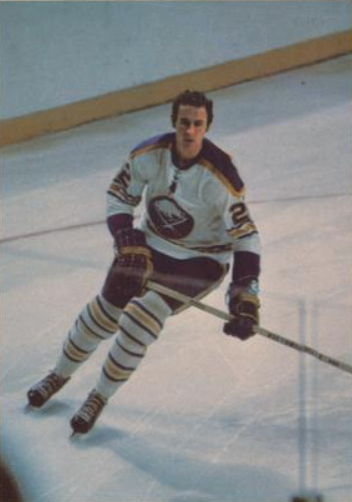
- McKay in 1971 photo
- Born: August 22, 1946 (age 79) Edmonton, Alberta, Canada
- Height: 6 ft 4 in (193 cm)
- Weight: 183 lb (83 kg; 13 st 1 lb)
- Position: Defence
- Shot: Left
- Played for: Chicago Black Hawks; Buffalo Sabres; California Golden Seals; Edmonton Oilers; Cleveland Crusaders; Birmingham Bulls; Minnesota Fighting Saints
- Playing career: 1967–1982

Raymond Owen McKay (born August 22, 1946 in Edmonton, Alberta) is a former professional ice hockey defenceman. He played in the National Hockey League with the Chicago Black Hawks, Buffalo Sabres, and California Golden Seals from 1968 to 1974. He also played in the World Hockey Association with the Edmonton Oilers, Cleveland Crusaders, Birmingham Bulls, and Minnesota Fighting Saints from 1974 to 1978.

In his NHL career, McKay played in 140 games, scoring two goals and adding sixteen assists. In the WHA, McKay played in 212 games, scoring fourteen goals and adding forty-four assists.

Ray currently runs "Ray McKay's Hockey Specialized Training" program, based in Ilderton, Ontario.

== Career statistics ==
=== Regular season and playoffs ===
			Regular season					Playoffs
Season	Team	League	GP	G	A	Pts	PIM	GP	G	A	Pts	PIM
1965–66	Moose Jaw Canucks	SJHL	57	3	20	23	103	5	0	2	2	8
1966–67	Moose Jaw Canucks	CMJHL	56	6	22	28	104	14	0	6	6	34
1967–68	Dallas Black Hawks	CHL	58	2	5	7	68	5	0	0	0	9
1968–69	Chicago Black Hawks	NHL	9	0	1	1	12	—	—	—	—	—
1968–69	Dallas Black Hawks	CHL	61	4	13	17	164	—	—	—	—	—
1969–70	Chicago Black Hawks	NHL	17	0	0	0	23	—	—	—	—	—
1969–70	Dallas Black Hawks	CHL	12	0	3	3	18	—	—	—	—	—
1969–70	Portland Buckaroos	WHL	—	—	—	—	—	2	0	0	0	25
1970–71	Chicago Black Hawks	NHL	2	0	0	0	0	—	—	—	—	—
1970–71	Portland Buckaroos	WHL	55	1	25	26	111	11	0	7	7	10
1971–72	Buffalo Sabres	NHL	39	0	3	3	18	—	—	—	—	—
1971–72	Cincinnati Swords	AHL	14	1	4	5	39	10	0	4	4	36
1972–73	Buffalo Sabres	NHL	1	0	0	0	0	—	—	—	—	—
1972–73	Cincinnati Swords	AHL	70	5	32	37	123	15	0	8	8	49
1973–74	California Golden Seals	NHL	72	2	12	14	49	—	—	—	—	—
1974–75	Edmonton Oilers	WHA	69	8	20	28	47	—	—	—	—	—
1975–76	Cleveland Crusaders	WHA	68	3	10	13	44	3	0	0	0	4
1975–76	Syracuse Blazers	NAHL	3	1	1	2	0	—	—	—	—	—
1976–77	Minnesota Fighting Saints	WHA	42	2	9	11	28	—	—	—	—	—
1976–77	Birmingham Bulls	WHA	19	0	1	1	11	—	—	—	—	—
1977–78	Edmonton Oilers	WHA	14	1	4	5	4	4	0	1	1	4
1977–78	Diavoli HC Milano	ITA	—	—	—	—	—	—	—	—	—	—
1978–79	Springfield Indians	AHL	69	2	27	29	42	—	—	—	—	—
1979–80	Adirondack Red Wings	AHL	5	0	0	0	27	—	—	—	—	—
1979–80	Hershey Bears	AHL	67	2	28	30	37	16	4	10	14	11
1981–82	HC Varese	ITA	—	—	—	—	—	—	—	—	—	—
WHA totals			212	14	44	58	134	7	0	1	1	8
NHL totals			140	2	16	18	102	—	—	—	—	—

== Awards ==
- CMJHL First All-Star Team – 1967
