= 1976–77 Serie A (ice hockey) season =

Italian professional ice hockey season

The 1976–77 Serie A season was the 43rd season of the Serie A, the top level of ice hockey in Italy. Seven teams participated in the league, and HC Bolzano won the championship.

== First round ==
	Club	Pts
1.	HC Bolzano	42
2.	HC Gherdëina	39
3.	HC Alleghe	33
4.	SG Cortina	22
5.	SV Ritten	19
6.	HC Brunico	11
7.	HC Valpellice	2

== Final round ==
	Club	Pts
1.	HC Bolzano	47
2.	HC Gherdëina	44
3.	HC Alleghe	35
4.	SG Cortina	22
