= 1978–79 Serie A (ice hockey) season =

Italian professional ice hockey season

The 1978–79 Serie A season was the 45th season of the Serie A, the top level of ice hockey in Italy. Nine teams participated in the league, and HC Bolzano won the championship.

== Regular season ==
	Club	Pts
1.	HC Bolzano	58
2.	HC Gherdëina	55
3.	HC Meran	40
4.	SG Cortina	37
5.	HC Brunico	28
6.	Asiago Hockey	24
7.	HC Diavoli Milano	21
8.	HC Alleghe	20
9.	HC Valpellice	5
