= 1972–73 Serie A (ice hockey) season =

Italian professional ice hockey season

The 1972–73 Serie A season was the 39th season of the Serie A, the top level of ice hockey in Italy. Nine teams participated in the league, and HC Bolzano won the championship by defeating SG Cortina in the final.

== Final round ==
	Club	Pts
1.	HC Bolzano	39
2.	SG Cortina	39
3.	HC Merano	23
4.	HC Diavoli Milano	22

=== Final ===
- HC Bolzano - SG Cortina 5:4

== Placing round ==
	Club	Pts
5.	HC Gardena	28
6.	HC Alleghe	27
7.	SG Brunico	17
8.	Asiago Hockey	11
9.	Auronzo	2
