= 1962–63 Serie A (ice hockey) season =

Italian professional ice hockey season

The 1962–63 Serie A season was the 29th season of the Serie A, the top level of ice hockey in Italy. Five teams participated in the league, and HC Bolzano won the championship.

== Regular season ==
	Club	Pts
1.	HC Bolzano	13
2.	SG Cortina	12
3.	HC Diavoli Milano	10
4.	HC Gherdëina	5
5.	SSV Bozen	0
