= 1977–78 Serie A (ice hockey) season =

Italian professional ice hockey season

The 1977–78 Serie A season was the 44th season of the Serie A, the top level of ice hockey in Italy. Nine teams participated in the league, and HC Bolzano won the championship.

== Regular season ==
	Club	Pts
1.	HC Bolzano	54
2.	SG Cortina	47
3.	HC Gherdëina	44
4.	SV Ritten	40
5.	HC Alleghe	31
6.	HC Diavoli Milano	30
7.	Asiago Hockey	21
8.	HC Valpellice	15
9.	HC Brunico	6
