= 1999–2000 Serie A (ice hockey) season =

Italian professional ice hockey season

The 1999–2000 Serie A season was the 66th season of the Serie A, the top level of ice hockey in Italy. 15 teams participated in the league, and HC Bozen won the championship by defeating Asiago Hockey in the final.

== First round ==
	Club	GP	W	OTW	OTL	L	GF–GA	Pts
1.	Asiago Hockey	28	26	1	0	1	204:38	80
2.	HC Meran	28	21	2	0	5	129:73	67
3.	SHC Fassa	28	21	0	2	5	145:67	65
4.	HC Bolzano	28	19	2	3	4	168:63	64
5.	WSV Sterzing Broncos	28	17	4	0	7	130:93	59
6.	HC Alleghe	28	17	2	1	8	140:78	56
7.	HC Brunico	28	17	0	2	9	129:108	53
8.	HC Valpellice	28	12	2	2	12	93:88	42
9.	HC Como	28	12	0	2	14	95:120	38
10.	SV Ritten	28	9	2	0	17	96:132	31
11.	HC Auronzo	28	8	1	0	19	107:171	26
12.	HC Appiano	28	6	1	3	18	84:144	23
13.	AS Varese Hockey	28	3	0	2	23	66:142	11
14.	HC Laces Val Venosta	28	2	1	1	24	57:188	9
15.	HC Zoldo	28	2	0	0	26	72:210	6

== Second round ==
=== Group A ===
	Club	GP	W	OTW	OTL	L	GF–GA	Pts (Bonus)
1.	Asiago Hockey	8	7	1	0	0	47:13	49(26)
2.	HC Bozen	8	4	1	0	3	45:23	35(21)
3.	HC Meran	8	3	0	1	4	22:35	32(22)
4.	SHC Fassa	8	2	0	1	5	21:42	28(21)
5.	WSV Sterzing Broncos	8	1	1	1	5	15:37	25(19)

=== Group B ===
	Club	GP	W	OTW	OTL	L	GF–GA	Pts (Bonus)
6.	HC Alleghe	8	8	0	0	0	54:21	42(18)
7.	HC Valpellice	8	3	0	2	3	28:29	25(14)
8.	HC Appiano	8	3	3	0	2	44:29	22(7)
9.	SV Ritten	8	2	0	1	5	36:37	17(10)
10.	HC Laces Val Venosta	8	1	0	0	7	16:62	6(3)

=== Group C ===
	Club	GP	W	OTW	OTL	L	GF–GA	Pts (Bonus)
11.	HC Brunico	8	6	0	2	0	51:27	37(17)
12.	HC Como	8	4	1	1	2	45:34	27(12)
13.	HC Zoldo	8	3	1	0	4	37:46	13(2)
14.	AS Varese Hockey	8	2	1	0	5	44:41	11(3)
15.	HC Auronzo	8	2	0	0	6	31:59	6(8)*

== Playoffs ==
=== Qualification ===
- HC Valpellice - HC Como 4:0

=== Bracket ===
Quarter-finals
Asiago Hockey	3
HC Valpellice	0
SHC Fassa	3
WSV Sterzing Broncos	0
HC Bozen	3
HC Brunico	0
HC Meran	2
HC Alleghe	3

Semi-finals
Asiago Hockey	3
SHC Fassa	0
HC Bozen	3
HC Alleghe	2

Final
Asiago Hockey	1
HC Bozen	3
