= 1981–82 Serie A (ice hockey) season =

Italian professional ice hockey season

The 1981–82 Serie A season was the 48th season of the Serie A, the top level of ice hockey in Italy. Nine teams participated in the league, and HC Bolzano won the championship.

== First round ==
	Club	Pts
1.	HC Bolzano	60
2.	HC Brunico	41
3.	Asiago Hockey	40
4.	HC Gherdëina	36
5.	HC Meran	36
6.	SG Cortina	27
7.	HC Alleghe	24
8.	HC Valpellice	18
9.	AS Varese Hockey	6

== Final round ==
	Club	Pts
1.	HC Bolzano	14
2.	HC Brunico	12
3.	Asiago Hockey	6
4.	HC Gherdëina	4
