= 1982–83 Serie A (ice hockey) season =

Italian professional ice hockey season

The 1982–83 Serie A season was the 49th season of the Serie A, the top level of ice hockey in Italy. Nine teams participated in the league, and HC Bolzano won the championship.

== First round ==
	Club	Pts
1.	HC Bolzano	53
2.	HC Brunico	49
3.	Asiago Hockey	41
4.	HC Gherdëina	36
5.	HC Meran	35
6.	SG Cortina	31
7.	HC Alleghe	27
8.	HC Valpellice	10
9.	AS Varese Hockey	6

== Final round ==
	Club	Pts
1.	HC Bolzano	46
2.	HC Gherdëina	34
3.	Asiago Hockey	29
4.	HC Brunico	27
5.	HC Meran	25
6.	SG Cortina	19
