= 1983–84 Serie A (ice hockey) season =

Italian professional ice hockey season

The 1983–84 Serie A season was the 50th season of the Serie A, the top level of ice hockey in Italy. Eight teams participated in the league, and HC Bolzano won the championship by defeating HC Meran in the final.

== Regular season ==
	Club	Pts
1.	HC Bolzano	42
2.	HC Meran	36
3.	HC Brunico	36
4.	HC Alleghe	30
5.	AS Varese Hockey	29
6.	Asiago Hockey	24
7.	HC Gherdëina	22
8.	SG Cortina	5

== Playoffs ==
Quarterfinals
1	HC Bolzano	2
8	SG Cortina	1
4	HC Alleghe	2
5	AS Varese Hockey	1
2	HC Meran	2
7	HC Gherdëina	0
3	HC Brunico	2
6	Asiago Hockey	0

Semifinals
1	HC Bolzano	2
4	HC Alleghe	0
2	HC Brunico	1
3	HC Meran	2

Finals
1	HC Bolzano	2
3	HC Meran	0
