= 1996–97 Serie A (ice hockey) season =

Italian professional ice hockey season

The 1996–97 Serie A season was the 63rd season of the Serie A, the top level of ice hockey in Italy. 16 teams participated in the league, and HC Bozen won the championship by defeating HC Milan 24 in the final. HC Bozen and HC Milan 24 qualified directly for the final round, because they were playing in the Alpenliga during the regular season.

== First round ==
	Club
1.	HC Fassa
2.	HC Gherdëina
3.	HC Courmaosta
4.	HC Meran
5.	HC Alleghe
6.	EV Brunico
7.	SG Cortina
8.	GS Feltre
9.	Asiago Hockey
10.	SV Ritten
11.	HC Como
12.	USG Zoldo
13.	WSV Sterzing
14.	SC Laces

== Second round ==
=== Group A ===
	Club	GP	W	T	L	GF–GA	Pts (Bonus)
1.	SHC Fassa	12	10	0	2	72:32	37(6)
2.	HC Meran	12	9	0	3	59:41	31(5)
3.	HC Alleghe	12	8	0	4	55:43	26(4)
4.	Asiago Hockey	12	6	1	5	66:65	20(2)
5.	GS Feltre	12	4	0	8	42:54	17(3)
6.	USG Zoldo	12	3	0	9	53:76	11(1)
7.	SSI Vipiteno	12	1	1	10	42:78	4(0)

=== Group B ===
	Club	GP	W	T	L	GF–GA	Pts (Bonus)
1.	HC Gherdëina	12	9	1	2	71:30	34(6)
2.	HC Brunico	12	8	0	4	53:31	28(4)
3.	HC Courmaosta	12	5	2	5	41:43	22(5)
4.	SC Laces	12	7	0	5	52:64	20(0)
5.	SV Ritten	12	5	0	7	42:56	18(2)
6.	SG Cortina	12	3	0	9	40:56	12(3)
7.	HC Como	12	3	1	8	36:55	11(1)

== Final round ==
	Club	GP	W	T	L	GF–GA	Pts
1.	HC 24 Milan	10	8	0	2	214:105	24
2.	HC Bozen	10	8	0	2	171:123	24
3.	SHC Fassa	10	6	1	3	154:114	19
4.	HC Meran	10	4	0	6	138:94	11
5.	HC Brunico	10	3	1	6	126:163	10
6.	HC Gherdëina	10	0	0	10	111:144	0

== Playoffs ==
Semi-finals
HC Milan 24	2
HC Meran	0
HC Bozen	2
HC Fassa	0

Final
HC Milan 24	1
HC Bozen	3
Third place
not held
