= 1984–85 Serie A (ice hockey) season =

Italian professional ice hockey season

The 1984–85 Serie A season was the 51st season of the Serie A, the top level of ice hockey in Italy. Ten teams participated in the league, and HC Bolzano won the championship by defeating HC Alleghe in the final.

== First round ==
	Club	GP	W	T	L	GF–GA	Pts
1.	HC Bolzano	18	16	1	1	151:60	33
2.	AS Varese Hockey	18	12	1	5	97:55	25
3.	HC Alleghe	18	10	3	5	86:73	23
4.	HC Gherdëina	18	9	1	8	104:92	19
5.	HC Brunico	18	7	4	7	73:79	18
6.	Asiago Hockey	18	7	4	7	98:98	18
7.	HC Auronzo	18	6	2	10	69:110	14
8.	HC Meran	18	5	3	10	76:89	13
9.	SG Cortina	18	5	2	11	78:117	12
10.	HC Como	18	2	1	15	74:133	5

== Second round ==
=== Group A ===
	Club	GP	W	T	L	GF–GA	Pts (Bonus)
1.	HC Bolzano	8	6	0	2	70:21	17(5)
2.	HC Alleghe	8	4	1	3	38:36	13(4)
3.	HC Brunico	8	4	0	4	24:35	11(3)
4.	SG Cortina	8	3	2	3	26:52	9(1)
5.	HC Auronzo	8	1	1	6	24:38	5(2)

=== Group B ===
	Club	GP	W	T	L	GF–GA	Pts (Bonus)
1.	HC Gherdëina	8	6	1	1	47:24	17(4)
2.	AS Varese Hockey	8	5	1	2	38:30	16(5)
3.	HC Meran	8	4	0	4	38:52	10(2)
4.	Asiago Hockey	8	3	0	5	46:38	9(3)
5.	HC Como	8	1	0	7	34:59	3(1)

== Playoffs ==
Quarterfinals
A1	HC Bolzano	2
B4	Asiago Hockey	1
B2	AS Varese Hockey	2
A3	HC Brunico	0
B1	HC Gherdëina	2
A4	SG Cortina	0
A2	HC Alleghe	2
B3	HC Meran	0

Semifinals
A1	HC Bolzano	2
B2	AS Varese Hockey	1
B1	HC Gherdëina	1
A2	HC Alleghe	2

Finals
A1	HC Bolzano	2
A2	HC Alleghe	1

== Relegation ==
- HC Auronzo - HC Como 5:2/5:2
