= 1989–90 Serie A (ice hockey) season =

Sports season

The 1989–90 Serie A season was the 56th season of the Serie A, the top level of ice hockey in Italy. 10 teams participated in the league, and HC Bozen won the championship by defeating Asiago Hockey in the final.

== Regular season ==
	Club	GP	W	T	L	GF–GA	Pts
1.	HC Bozen	36	31	3	2	337:134	65
2.	Asiago Hockey	36	25	3	8	257:172	53
3.	AS Varese Hockey	36	23	1	12	199:143	47
4.	HC Milano Saima	36	20	3	13	220:174	43
5.	HC Alleghe	36	19	4	13	208:145	42
6.	HC Devils Milano	36	17	2	17	190:198	36
7.	HC Fassa	36	11	5	20	156:197	27
8.	HC Brunico	36	9	3	24	166:235	21
9.	HC Fiemme Cavalese	36	7	1	28	182:347	15
10.	HC Meran	36	5	1	30	181:351	11

== Playoffs ==
Semi-finals
HC Bozen	3
HC Milan	0
Asiago Hockey	3
AS Varese Hockey	0

Final
HC Bozen	3
Asiago Hockey	0
Third place
AS Varese Hockey	2
HC Milan	1

== Relegation round ==
	Club	GP	W	T	L	GF–GA	Pts (Bonus)
5.	HC Alleghe	10	6	3	1	68:44	36(21)
6.	HC Devils Milano	10	6	1	3	66:47	31(18)
7.	HC Brunico	10	5	1	4	61:69	21(10)
8.	HC Fassa	10	2	0	8	31:54	17(13)
9.	HC Fiemme Cavalese	10	4	1	5	73:66	16(7)
10.	HC Meran	10	4	0	6	55:74	13(5)
