= 1991–92 Alpenliga season =

Sports season

The 1991–92 Alpenliga season was the first season of the Alpenliga, a multi-national ice hockey league. The league was split into Group A and Group B. 20 teams participated in the league, and HC Devils Milano of Italy won the championship.

== Regular season ==
=== Group A ===
Place	Team	GP	Pts	W	L	TVH	+/-
1	Italy HC Milan	18	32	16	2	102:56	+46
2	Austria EC VSV	18	28	14	4	104:62	+42
3	Austria EV Innsbruck	18	26	13	5	85:70	+15
4	Italy HC Varese	18	22	11	7	76:70	+6
5	Austria Wiener EV	18	20	10	8	80:59	+21
6	Austria EK Zell am See	18	18	9	9	70:80	-10
7	Slovenia Olimpija	18	12	6	12	79:75	+4
8	Italy SHC Fassa	18	12	6	12	80:93	-13
9	Italy HC Pustertal	18	8	4	14	76:103	-27
10	Italy HC Fiemme	18	2	1	17	51:135	-84

=== Group B ===
Place	Team	GP	Pts	W	L	TVH	+/-
1	Italy Devils Milano	18	36	18	0	144:46	+98
2	Italy HC Bolzano	18	24	12	6	114:67	+47
3	Italy Asiago Hockey	18	24	12	6	114:73	+41
4	Austria Kac	18	22	11	7	85:79	+6
5	Italy Alleghe	18	18	9	9	109:95	+14
6	Slovenia Jesenice	18	18	9	9	104:95	+9
7	Austria Graz	18	18	9	9	90:86	+4
8	Austria VEU Feldkirch	18	12	6	12	79:89	-10
9	Slovenia Bled	18	6	3	15	52:114	-62
10	Italy USG Zoldo	18	2	1	17	48:195	-147

== Play-offs ==
=== Semi-finals ===
- Milan (A1) – HC Bolzano (B2): 3:4 (0:0, 2:2, 1:2)
- HC Devils Milano (B1) – VSV (A2): 4:2 (1:2, 2:0, 1:0)

=== 3rd place ===
- HC Milan (A1) – VSV (A2): 5:6 n.V. (2:0, 1:2, 2:3, 0:1)

=== Final ===
- Devils Milano (B1) – HC Bolzano (B2): 8:0 (2:0, 3:0, 3:0)
