= 1987–88 Serie A (ice hockey) season =

Italian professional ice hockey season

The 1987–88 Serie A season was the 54th season of the Serie A, the top level of ice hockey in Italy. 10 teams participated in the league, and HC Bozen won the championship by defeating HC Meran in the final.

== Regular season ==
	Club	GP	W	T	L	GF–GA	Pts
1.	HC Bozen	36	30	3	3	256:103	63
2.	HC Meran	36	20	6	10	208:160	46
3.	HC Alleghe	36	19	3	14	171:152	41
4.	AS Varese Hockey	36	17	6	13	165:125	40
5.	HC Fassa	36	16	5	15	163:165	37
6.	EV Brunico	36	15	3	18	133:183	33
7.	Asiago Hockey	36	13	6	17	185:164	32
8.	SG Cortina	36	12	8	16	160:184	32
9.	HC Cavalese	36	11	3	22	167:244	25
10.	SV Ritten	36	4	3	29	109:237	11

== Playoffs ==
Quarterfinals
1	HC Bozen	2
8	SG Cortina	0
4	AS Varese Hockey	2
5	HC Fassa	1
2	HC Meran	2
7	Asiago Hockey	1
3	HC Alleghe	2
6	EV Brunico	0

Semifinals
1	HC Bozen	3
4	AS Varese Hockey	0
2	HC Meran	3
3	HC Alleghe	1

Finals
1	HC Bozen	3
2	HC Meran	0
