= 1992–93 Alpenliga season =

This was the 1992–93 Alpenliga season, the second season of the Alpenliga, a multi-national ice hockey league. 16 teams participated in the league, and HC Alleghe won the championship by defeating HC Bozen in the final.

== Regular season ==
Place	Team	GP	Pts	W	T	L	GF:GA	GD
1	(Italy) Devils Milano	30	48	23	2	5	147:77	+70
2	(Austria) VSV	30	45	20	5	5	138:89	+49
3	(Italy) Bozen	30	40	18	4	8	160:105	+55
4	(Italy) Alleghe	30	39	16	7	7	133:111	+22
5	(Austria) Graz	30	39	19	1	10	171:123	+48
6	(Austria) VEU Feldkirch	30	36	16	4	10	131:111	+20
7	(Italy) Asiago Hockey	30	35	14	7	9	151:128	+23
8	(Slovenia) Jesenice	30	34	14	6	10	129:114	+15
9	(Austria) EK Zell am See	30	32	13	6	11	121:118	+3
10	(Austria) EC KAC	30	30	12	6	12	122:116	+6
11	(Austria) EV Innsbruck	30	25	10	5	15	129:162	-33
12	(Italy) HC Pustertal	30	24	9	6	15	135:173	-38
13	(Italy) HC Varese	30	18	7	4	19	113:153	-40
14	(Italy) HC Gherdëina	30	15	5	5	20	110:175	-65
15	(Italy) HC Fiemme	30	10	5	0	25	119:197	-78
16	(Italy) SHC Fassa	30	10	4	2	24	104:188	-84

== Play-offs ==
=== Semi-finals ===
- Devils Mailand (1) – Alleghe (4): 3:8 (1:1, 1:1, 1:6)
- VSV (2) – Bozen (3): 1:5 (0:0, 0:1, 1:4)

=== 3rd place ===
- VSV (2) – Devils Milano (1): 5:4 (3:1, 1:3, 1:0)

=== Final ===
- Bozen (3) – Alleghe (4): 4:7 (2:1, 1:3, 1:3)
