= 1995–96 Serie A (ice hockey) season =

Italian professional ice hockey season

The 1995–96 Serie A season was the 62nd season of the Serie A, the top level of ice hockey in Italy. Nine teams participated in the league, and HC Bozen won the championship by defeating HC 24 Milan in the final.

== Regular season ==
	Club	GP	W	T	L	GF–GA	Pts
1.	HC Bozen	32	26	3	3	214:105	55
2.	HC 24 Milan	32	19	4	9	171:123	42
3.	HC Gherdëina	32	19	4	9	154:114	42
4.	AS Varese Hockey	32	19	3	10	138:94	41
5.	HC Fassa	32	12	3	17	126:163	27
6.	Asiago Hockey	32	12	1	19	111:144	25
7.	HC Brunico	32	10	4	18	120:140	24
8.	HC Alleghe	32	11	2	19	101:148	24
9.	HC Devils Milano	32	4	0	28	110:214	8

== Playoffs ==
Quarterfinals
1	HC Bozen	3
8	HC Alleghe	0
4	AS Varese Hockey	3
5	HC Fassa	0
2	HC 24 Milan	3
7	EV Brunico	1
3	HC Gherdëina	3
6	Asiago Hockey	0

Semifinals
1	HC Bozen	3
4	AS Varese Hockey	2
2	HC 24 Milan	3
3	HC Gherdëina	1

Finals
1	HC Bozen	4
2	HC 24 Milan	1
