= 1990–91 Serie A (ice hockey) season =

Italian professional ice hockey season

The 1990–91 Serie A season was the 57th season of the Serie A, the top level of ice hockey in Italy. 10 teams participated in the league, and HC Milan won the championship.

== First round ==
	Club	GP	W	T	L	GF–GA	Pts
1.	HC Milan	36	30	1	5	255:140	61
2.	HC Bozen	36	23	4	9	224:161	50
3.	AS Varese Hockey	36	24	1	11	221:128	49
4.	HC Devils Milano	36	22	3	11	190:145	47
5.	HC Alleghe	36	20	2	14	193:155	42
6.	HC Fassa	36	17	4	15	158:158	38
7.	Asiago Hockey	36	14	6	16	170:146	34
8.	HC Brunico	36	7	4	25	142:288	18
9.	HC Fiemme Cavalese	36	6	4	26	130:235	16
10.	SG Cortina	36	1	3	32	114:263	5

== Final round ==
	Club	GP	W	T	L	GF–GA	Pts
1.	HC Milan	10	7	1	2	63:38	20(5)
2.	HC Bozen	10	6	2	2	60:43	14(4)
3.	HC Devils Milano	10	6	1	3	52:35	15(2)
4.	AS Varese Hockey	10	4	0	6	55:57	11(3)
5.	HC Fassa	10	3	0	7	37:69	6(0)
6.	HC Alleghe	10	2	0	8	46:71	5(1)

== Relegation round ==
	Club	GP	W	T	L	GF–GA	Pts
7.	Asiago Hockey	6	5	0	1	36:21	27(17)
8.	HC Fiemme Cavalese	3	0	3	25	44:40	14(8)
9.	HC Brunico	6	1	1	4	29:40	12(9)
10.	SG Cortina	6	2	1	3	33:41	7(2)
