= 1993–94 Alpenliga season =

1993–94 Alpenliga was the third season of the multi-national ice hockey league. 15 teams participated in the league, and HC Bozen won the championship by defeating AC Milano in the final.

== Regular season ==
Place	Team	GP	Pts	W	T	L	GF:GA	GD
1	Italy AC Milano	28	43	20	3	5	175:75	+100
2	Italy HC Bozen	28	42	18	6	4	160:93	+67
3	Austria EC Graz	28	41	20	1	7	166:71	+95
4	Italy HC Alleghe	28	40	17	6	5	99:79	+20
5	Austria VEU Feldkirch	28	37	17	3	8	128:75	+53
6	Austria EC KAC	28	36	16	4	8	163:107	+56
7	Austria EC VSV	28	34	15	4	9	138:89	+49
8	Italy HC Milano Saima	28	31	13	5	10	109:102	+7
9	Italy HC Courmayeur	28	30	13	4	11	104:106	-2
10	Italy HC Varèse	28	26	12	2	14	120:104	+16
11	Italy HC Fiemme	28	17	6	5	17	82:164	-82
12	Italy HC Gherdeina	28	14	6	2	20	94:188	-94
13	Italy HC Fassa	28	14	6	2	20	100:146	-46
14	Italy Asiago Hockey	28	10	4	2	22	76:166	-90
15	Italy SG Brunico	28	5	2	1	25	72:221	-149

== Playoffs ==
=== Semifinals ===
- AC Milano (1) – HC Alleghe (4): 7:4 (3:1, 3:2, 1:1)
- HC Bozen (2) – EC Graz (3): 7:6 OT (2:3, 1:3, 3:0, 1:0)

=== 3rd place ===
- EC Graz (3) – HC Alleghe (4): 7:1 (3:1, 4:0, 0:0)

=== Final ===
- AC Milano (1) – HC Bozen (2): 2:8 (0:3, 1:3, 1:2)
