= 1994–95 Serie A (ice hockey) season =

Italian professional ice hockey season

The 1994–95 Serie A season was the 61st season of the Serie A, the top level of ice hockey in Italy. 10 teams participated in the league, and HC Bozen won the championship by defeating AS Varese Hockey in the final.

== Regular season ==
	Club	GP	W	T	L	GF–GA	Pts
1.	HC Bozen	36	26	1	9	215:115	53
2.	AS Varese Hockey	36	23	3	10	169:111	49
3.	HC Courmaosta	36	17	7	10	139:120	41
4.	HC Milano Saima	36	16	4	16	141:149	36
5.	HC Devils Milano	36	14	6	16	156:165	34
6.	HC Gherdëina	36	15	4	17	158:166	34
7.	HC Alleghe	36	15	4	17	110:130	34
8.	HC Brunico	36	15	2	19	143:176	32
9.	HC Fassa	36	13	2	21	162:183	28
10.	Asiago Hockey	36	8	3	25	117:195	19

== Playoffs ==
Quarterfinals
1	HC Bozen	2
8	HC Brunico	0
4	HC Milano Saima	2
5	HC Devils Milano	1
2	AS Varese Hockey	2
7	HC Alleghe	0
3	HC Courmaosta	2
6	HC Gherdëina	1

Semifinals
1	HC Bozen	3
4	HC Milano Saima	1
2	AS Varese Hockey	3
3	HC Courmaosta	0

Finals
1	HC Bozen	3
2	AS Varese Hockey	2

== Relegation ==
- HC Fassa - Asiago Hockey 2:1 (9:4, 4:5, 9:5)
