= HC Bozen–Bolzano =

German: HC Bozen; Italian: HC Bolzano
- City: Bolzano, South Tyrol, Italy
- League: Serie A 1948–1991; 1999–2013; Alpenliga; 1991–1997; 1998–1999; ICE Hockey League; 2013–
- Founded: 1933; 93 years ago
- Home arena: Sparkasse Arena (Capacity: 7,200)
- Colors
- Owner: Otto Massimo
- General manager: Dr. Dieter Knoll
- Head coach: Kurt Kleinendorst
- Captain: Daniel Frank
- Media: VB33; SDF
- Website: www.hcb.net

Franchise history
- 1933–present: HC Bolzano

Championships
- Serie A: 19 (1963, 1973, 1977, 1978, 1979, 1982, 1983, 1984, 1985, 1988, 1990, 1995, 1996, 1997, 1998, 2000, 2008, 2009, 2012)
- Alpenliga: 1 (1994)
- EBEL: 2 (2014, 2018)

The Hockey Club Bolzano Foxes, also known as commercial name HCB Alto Adige Alperia (in Italian) or HCB Südtirol Alperia (in German) is an Italian professional ice hockey team located in the city of Bolzano, South Tyrol autonomous province, that plays in the ICE Hockey League (ICEHL). It remains the most successful team in the history of the Italian Serie A, with 19 championships.

== History ==
HC Bolzano was founded in 1933 and in the first twenty years of its existence, home games were played in an outdoor rink until 1953, when the club moved into the Bolzano Exhibition Hall (Messe Bozen), which was the first artificial ice was available. Eleven of the nineteen Italian league titles were won there before the team moved in 1994, to the newly built Sparkasse Arena. At the same time, the team also participated in the Alps League in part, an international ice hockey competition, attended by teams from Slovenia and Austria were involved. In addition to a master and three runner-up titles in this competition, the team also won another seven Italian titles, the last of which in 2012 was given the three-time winning the Coppa Italia, the Italian League Cup competition. Other achievements include three gains of the Supercoppa Italiana and the Six Nations tournament, also called Caucasian Ligacup, in 1994.

In 2013, the HC Bolzano applied again for inclusion in the Erste Bank Eishockey Liga (EBEL), after earlier applications failed each time due to the resistance of the Italian Ice Hockey Federation. However, the chaotic conditions in the Serie A paved the way to acceptance, since a large part of the club that was from the second division had been released. The move was also largely motivated by the need of a new major sponsor to help clear their financial situation.

Known as the HCB Südtirol in the EBEL (the main sponsor is the tourism promotion agency of the Alto Adige – Südtirol region), Bolzano had surprisingly successful inaugural season in 2013–14. On the back of a heavy recruitment scheme which centred in signing Canadian players of Italian heritage, Bolzano finished in fourth place by the end of the Regulation season. In the EBEL finals, they went on to win the championship by defeating the EC Red Bull Salzburg in the finals, and in doing so becoming to first non-Austrian based club to win the Austrian Championship.

With the victory of the EBEL championship, Bolzano ensured qualification to the first edition of the Champions Hockey League, a prestigious tournament for European clubs. Despite their status of EBEL defending Champions, Bolzano due to numerous financial difficulties that risked compromising the entry of the team in these competitions, were late in confirming their status for a second EBEL season.

In May 2016 it was announced that the South Tyrol energy producer Alperia would become the main sponsor of the team.

In 2018 the HC Bozen Alperia defeat the EC Red Bull Salzburg in game-7 of the final to win the EBEL championship for a second time. After the successful final, historic captain Alexander Egger announced his retirement from professional ice hockey.

== Honours ==
- Austrian Hockey League
  - Winners (2): 2013–14, 2017–18
- Serie A
  - Winners (19): 1962–63, 1972–73, 1976–77, 1977–78, 1978–79, 1981–82, 1982–83, 1983–84, 1984–85, 1987–88, 1989–90, 1994–95, 1995–96, 1996–97, 1997–98, 1999–00, 2007–08, 2008–09, 2011–12
- Coppa Italia
  - Winners (3): 2004, 2007, 2009
- Supercoppa Italiana
  - Winners (4): 2004, 2007, 2008, 2012
- Alpenliga
  - Winners (1): 1994
- Six Nations Tournament:
  - Winners (1): 1994
- Coppa delle Alpi:
  - Winners (1): 1963

== Players ==
=== Current roster ===
Updated 12 August 2026

HC Bolzano roster
No.	Nat	Player	Pos	S/G	Age	Acquired	Birthplace
70	(Canada)	Louis Domingue	G	R	34	2026	Mont-Saint-Hilaire, Quebec, Canada
31	(Italy)	Marco Costantini	G	L	24	2026	Hamilton, Ontario, Canada
5	(Canada)	Jackson van de Leest	D	L	25	2026	Kelowna, British Columbia, Canada
22	(Italy)	Carmine Buono	D	L	29	2026	Burnaby, British Columbia, Canada
23	(Italy)	Noah Frick	D	L	19	2026	Bolzano, Italy
26	(Finland)	Teemu Kivihalme	D	L	31	2026	Cloquet, Minnesota, United States
53	(Italy)	Enrico Larcher	D	R	22	2025	Pieve di Cadore, Italy
74	(United States)	Blake Hillman	D	L	30	2026	Elk River, Minnesota, United States
92	(Canada)	Zac Leslie	D	L	32	2026	Ottawa, Ontario, Canada
9	(Italy)	Daniel Mantenuto	C	L	28	2022	Thornhill, Ontario, Canada
10	(Italy)	Dustin Gazley	RW	R	37	2020	Novi, Michigan, United States
11	(Italy)	Cristiano DiGiacinto	C	L	30	2023	Hamilton, Ontario, Canada
13	(Italy)	Daniel Gellon	RW	L	25	2026	Bolzano, Italy
15	(Canada)	Turner Elson	C	L	33	2026	New Westminster, British Columbia, Canada
18	(Italy)	Bryce Misley	C	L	26	2025	Calgary, Alberta, Canada
19	(Canada)	Brad McClure	RW	R	32	2022	Stratford, Ontario, Canada
20	(Italy)	Jakob Fuchs	RW	L	22	2026	Silandro, Italy
24	(United States)	Cole Schneider	W	L	35	2025	Williamsville, New York, United States
27	(Italy)	Nicolò Remolato	W	R	21	2026	Bolzano, Italy
76	(Canada)	Isaac Ratcliffe	LW	L	27	2026	London, Ontario, Canada
77	(Italy)	Matt Bradley	C	R	29	2024	Vancouver, British Columbia, Canada
93	(Italy)	Luca Frigo	LW	L	33	2016	Moncalieri, Italy

=== Notable alumni ===
- Roger Åkerström
- Glenn Anderson
- Alexander Andrijevski
- Dave Baseggio
- Scott Beattie
- Oleg Belov
- James Black
- Jim Boni
- Robin Bouchard
- Steve Bozek
- Markus Brunner
- Jim Camazzola
- Dan Currie
- Matt DeMarchi
- Doug Derraugh
- Nate DiCasmirro
- Flavio Faggioni
- Mario Doyon
- Mark Dutiaume
- Daniel Fernholm
- Ron Flockhart
- Martin Gendron
- Phil Groeneveld
- Chris Hajt
- (Finland) Jari Helle (coach)
- Rudi Hiti
- Niklas Hjalmarsson
- Viktors Ignatjevs
- Tony Iob
- Kim Issel
- Lars Ivarsson
- Jaromír Jágr
- Regan Kelly
- Jordan Krestanovich
- Brian Loney
- Jamie Lundmark
- Bob Manno
- Daniel Marois
- Shayne McCosh
- Paul Messier
- Robert Mulick
- Jason Muzzatti
- Mark Napier
- Sergei Naumov
- Jeff Nelson
- Jan Němeček
- Kent Nilsson
- Robert Oberrauch
- Josh Olson
- Gates Orlando
- Grigorijs Panteļejevs
- Dave Pasin
- Gino Pasqualotto
- Martin Pavlu
- Mario Nobili
- Michel Petit
- Neil Petruic
- Frank Pietrangelo
- Ray Podloski
- Deron Quint
- Mike Rosati
- Adam Russo
- Peter Schaefer
- Jeff Sebastian
- Patrice Tardif
- Lucio Topatigh
- Sylvain Turgeon
- Perry Turnbull
- Tony Tuzzolino
- Ramil Yuldashev
- Rob Zamuner
- Bruno Zarrillo
