= 1991–92 Serie A (ice hockey) season =

Italian professional ice hockey season

The 1991–92 Serie A season was the 58th season of the Serie A, the top level of ice hockey in Italy. 10 teams participated in the league, and HC Devils Milano won the championship by defeating HC Milan in the final.

== Regular season ==
	Club	GP	W	T	L	GF–GA	Pts
1.	HC Devils Milano	18	16	0	2	147:45	32
2.	HC Alleghe	18	12	2	4	102:74	26
3.	HC Milan	18	12	1	5	124:62	25
4.	HC Bozen	18	11	1	6	101:63	23
5.	Asiago Hockey	18	9	2	7	99:74	20
6.	AS Varese Hockey	18	9	1	8	72:78	19
7.	HC Fassa	18	8	1	9	92:89	17
8.	HC Brunico	18	5	1	12	84:129	11
9.	HC Fiemme Cavalese	18	2	2	14	66:143	6
10.	USG Zoldo	18	0	1	17	35:165	1

== Playoffs ==
Quarterfinals
1	HC Devils Milano	3
8	HC Brunico	0
4	HC Bozen	0
5	Asiago Hockey	3
2	HC Alleghe	3
7	HC Fassa	0
3	HC Milan	3
6	AS Varese Hockey	2

Semifinals
1	HC Devils Milano	3
5	Asiago Hockey	2
2	HC Alleghe	0
3	HC Milan	3

Finals
1	HC Devils Milano	4
3	HC Milan	0
