= 1992–93 Serie A (ice hockey) season =

Italian professional ice hockey season

The 1992–93 Serie A season was the 59th season of the Serie A, the top level of ice hockey in Italy. Nine teams participated in the league, and HC Devils Milano won the championship by defeating HC Bozen in the final.

== Regular season ==
	Club	GP	W	T	L	GF–GA	Pts (Bonus)
1.	HC Devils Milano	16	14	0	2	117:48	33(5)
2.	HC Bozen	16	12	3	1	102:51	31(4)
3.	HC Alleghe	16	8	3	5	75:71	23(4)
4.	HC Gherdëina	16	7	3	6	64:77	19(2)
5.	Asiago Hockey	16	6	3	7	78:74	18(3)
6.	HC Brunico	16	6	1	9	77:100	16(3)
7.	AS Varese Hockey	16	6	1	9	59:76	15(2)
8.	HC Fassa	16	3	2	11	54:86	8(0)
9.	HC Fiemme Cavalese	16	2	0	14	69:112	5(1)

== Playoffs ==
Quarterfinals
1	HC Devils Milano	3
8	HC Fassa	0
4	HC Gherdëina	0
5	Asiago Hockey	3
2	HC Bozen	3
7	AS Varese Hockey	0
3	HC Alleghe	3
6	HC Brunico	0

Semifinals
1	HC Devils Milano	3
5	Asiago Hockey	0
2	HC Bozen	3
3	HC Alleghe	0

Finals
1	HC Devils Milano	3
2	HC Bozen	2
