= 1993–94 Serie A (ice hockey) season =

Italian professional ice hockey season

The 1993–94 Serie A season was the 60th season of the Serie A, the top level of ice hockey in Italy. 11 teams participated in the league, and Milan AC won the championship by defeating HC Bozen in the final.

== Regular season ==
	Club	GP	W	T	L	GF–GA	Pts
1.	Milan AC	20	16	1	3	148:77	54
2.	HC Bozen	20	15	1	4	125:69	52
3.	AS Varese Hockey	20	15	2	3	99:59	45
4.	HC Milano Saima	20	11	2	7	98:77	39
5.	HC Courmaosta	20	10	4	6	109:82	39
6.	HC Alleghe	20	6	2	12	77:79	34
7.	HC Fassa	20	9	1	10	99:94	26
8.	HC Gherdëina	20	6	4	10	85:97	23
9.	HC Fiemme Cavalese	20	6	2	12	76:106	22
10.	Asiago Hockey	20	6	0	14	79:110	17
11.	EV Brunico	20	0	1	19	52:197	3

== Playoffs ==
Quarterfinals
1	Milan AC	2
8	HC Gherdëina	0
4	HC Milano Saima	0
5	HC Courmaosta	2
2	HC Bozen	2
7	HC Fassa	0
3	AS Varese Hockey	2
6	HC Alleghe	1

Semifinals
1	Milan AC	2
5	HC Courmaosta	0
2	HC Bozen	2
3	AS Varese Hockey	0

Finals
1	Milan AC	3
2	HC Bozen	2
