= HC Devils Milano =

- City: Milan, Italy
- League: Serie A
- Founded: 1989
- Home arena: Palacandy
- Colours: Red and black

HC Devils Milano were an ice hockey team in Milan, Italy. They played in the Serie A.

== History ==
The club dominated the Serie A between 1991 and 1994, winning three straight titles. They also participated in, and won, the Alpenliga in 1991. NHL player Jari Kurri played on the 1991 squad as he tried to force a trade from the Edmonton Oilers.

They moved to Courmayeur in 1996 and became the Devils Courmaosta.

=== Achievements ===
- Serie A champion : 1992, 1993, 1994
- Alpenliga champion : 1991

== Notable players ==
- Jari Kurri
- Rick Morocco
- Tom Chorske
