= 2011–12 NHL transactions =

The following is a list of all team-to-team transactions that have occurred in the National Hockey League during the 2011–12 NHL season. It lists what team each player has been traded to, signed by, or claimed by, and for which player(s) or draft pick(s), if applicable. Players who have retired are also listed.

== Retirement ==
Date	Last team	Name
July 19, 2011	Chris Osgood	Detroit Red Wings
July 20, 2011	Patrick Lalime	Buffalo Sabres
July 26, 2011	Kris Draper	Detroit Red Wings
August 12, 2011	Lee Sweatt	Ottawa Senators
August 19, 2011	Chris Drury	New York Rangers
August 22, 2011	Dave Scatchard	St. Louis Blues
September 2, 2011	Shane Hnidy	Boston Bruins
September 6, 2011	Jesse Boulerice	Edmonton Oilers
September 8, 2011	Cory Stillman	Carolina Hurricanes
September 10, 2011	Jason Bailey	Ottawa Senators
September 19, 2011	John Grahame	Colorado Avalanche
September 23, 2011	Mike Modano	Detroit Red Wings
October 15, 2011	David Hale	Ottawa Senators
October 20, 2011	Kris Chucko	Calgary Flames
December 1, 2011	Mike Grier	Buffalo Sabres
February 7, 2012	Owen Nolan	Minnesota Wild
February 13, 2012	Mike Comrie	Pittsburgh Penguins
February 15, 2012	Bryan McCabe	New York Rangers
March 13, 2012	Sean Avery	New York Rangers
May 31, 2012	Nicklas Lidstrom	Detroit Red Wings
June 12, 2012	Ian Laperriere	Philadelphia Flyers
June 20, 2012	Ethan Moreau	Los Angeles Kings

== Free agency ==
Date	Player	New team	Previous team
July 1, 2011	Mathieu Garon	Tampa Bay Lightning	Columbus Blue Jackets
July 1, 2011	Jamal Mayers	Chicago Blackhawks	San Jose Sharks
July 1, 2011	Ben Eager	Edmonton Oilers	San Jose Sharks
July 1, 2011	Jose Theodore	Florida Panthers	Minnesota Wild
July 1, 2011	Adam Pardy	Dallas Stars	Calgary Flames
July 1, 2011	Sean O'Donnell	Chicago Blackhawks	Philadelphia Flyers
July 1, 2011	Jeff Halpern	Washington Capitals	Montreal Canadiens
July 1, 2011	Radek Dvorak	Dallas Stars	Winnipeg Jets
July 1, 2011	Scottie Upshall	Florida Panthers	Columbus Blue Jackets
July 1, 2011	Mike Smith	Phoenix Coyotes	Tampa Bay Lightning
July 1, 2011	Raffi Torres	Phoenix Coyotes	Vancouver Canucks
July 1, 2011	Mark Mancari	Vancouver Canucks	Buffalo Sabres
July 1, 2011	Boyd Gordon	Phoenix Coyotes	Washington Capitals
July 1, 2011	Tim Brent	Carolina Hurricanes	Toronto Maple Leafs
July 1, 2011	Ed Jovanovski	Florida Panthers	Phoenix Coyotes
July 1, 2011	Vernon Fiddler	Dallas Stars	Phoenix Coyotes
July 1, 2011	Andreas Lilja	Philadelphia Flyers	Anaheim Ducks
July 1, 2011	Andrew Brunette	Chicago Blackhawks	Minnesota Wild
July 1, 2011	Jan Hejda	Colorado Avalanche	Columbus Blue Jackets
July 1, 2011	Marcel Goc	Florida Panthers	Nashville Predators
July 1, 2011	Maxime Talbot	Philadelphia Flyers	Pittsburgh Penguins
July 1, 2011	Derek Meech	Winnipeg Jets	Detroit Red Wings
July 1, 2011	Brian Boucher	Carolina Hurricanes	Philadelphia Flyers
July 1, 2011	Peter Budaj	Montreal Canadiens	Colorado Avalanche
July 1, 2011	Michael Rupp	New York Rangers	Pittsburgh Penguins
July 1, 2011	Mike Commodore	Detroit Red Wings	Columbus Blue Jackets
July 1, 2011	Steve Sullivan	Pittsburgh Penguins	Nashville Predators
July 1, 2011	Marty Reasoner	New York Islanders	Florida Panthers
July 1, 2011	Joel Ward	Washington Capitals	Nashville Predators
July 1, 2011	Roman Hamrlik	Washington Capitals	Montreal Canadiens
July 1, 2011	Erik Cole	Montreal Canadiens	Carolina Hurricanes
July 1, 2011	Darcy Hordichuk	Edmonton Oilers	Florida Panthers
July 1, 2011	Cam Barker	Edmonton Oilers	Minnesota Wild
July 1, 2011	Alex Auld	Ottawa Senators	Montreal Canadiens
July 1, 2011	Michael Ryder	Dallas Stars	Boston Bruins
July 1, 2011	Benoit Pouliot	Boston Bruins	Montreal Canadiens
July 1, 2011	Ville Leino	Buffalo Sabres	Philadelphia Flyers
July 1, 2011	Marco Sturm	Vancouver Canucks	Washington Capitals
July 1, 2011	Alexei Ponikarovsky	Carolina Hurricanes	Los Angeles Kings
July 1, 2011	Sheldon Souray	Dallas Stars	Edmonton Oilers
July 1, 2011	Jim Vandermeer	San Jose Sharks	Edmonton Oilers
July 1, 2011	Tomas Fleischmann	Florida Panthers	Colorado Avalanche
July 1, 2011	Curtis Sanford	Columbus Blue Jackets	Montreal Canadiens
July 1, 2011	Eric Belanger	Edmonton Oilers	Phoenix Coyotes
July 1, 2011	Chuck Kobasew	Colorado Avalanche	Minnesota Wild
July 1, 2011	Jean-Sebastien Giguere	Colorado Avalanche	Toronto Maple Leafs
July 1, 2011	Brian Elliott	St. Louis Blues	Colorado Avalanche
July 1, 2011	Ryan Potulny	Washington Capitals	Ottawa Senators
July 1, 2011	Corey Potter	Edmonton Oilers	Pittsburgh Penguins
July 1, 2011	Daniel Carcillo	Chicago Blackhawks	Philadelphia Flyers
July 1, 2011	Tanner Glass	Winnipeg Jets	Vancouver Canucks
July 1, 2011	Andrew Ebbett	Vancouver Canucks	Phoenix Coyotes
July 1, 2011	Michal Handzus	San Jose Sharks	Los Angeles Kings
July 1, 2011	Sean Bergenheim	Florida Panthers	Tampa Bay Lightning
July 1, 2011	Andrew Joudrey	Columbus Blue Jackets	Washington Capitals
July 1, 2011	Nick Drazenovic	Columbus Blue Jackets	St. Louis Blues
July 1, 2011	Mark Dekanich	Columbus Blue Jackets	Nashville Predators
July 1, 2011	Jake Dowell	Dallas Stars	Chicago Blackhawks
July 1, 2011	Nolan Yonkman	Florida Panthers	Phoenix Coyotes
July 1, 2011	Colin McDonald	Pittsburgh Penguins	Edmonton Oilers
July 1, 2011	J.T. Wyman	Tampa Bay Lightning	Montreal Canadiens
July 2, 2011	Brad Richards	New York Rangers	Dallas Stars
July 2, 2011	Matt Gilroy	Tampa Bay Lightning	New York Rangers
July 2, 2011	Tim Connolly	Toronto Maple Leafs	Buffalo Sabres
July 2, 2011	Anthony Stewart	Carolina Hurricanes	Winnipeg Jets
July 2, 2011	Simon Gagne	Los Angeles Kings	Tampa Bay Lightning
July 2, 2011	Alexandre Bolduc	Phoenix Coyotes	Vancouver Canucks
July 2, 2011	Ian White	Detroit Red Wings	San Jose Sharks
July 2, 2011	Tomas Vokoun	Washington Capitals	Florida Panthers
July 2, 2011	Randy Jones	Winnipeg Jets	Tampa Bay Lightning
July 2, 2011	Kent Huskins	St. Louis Blues	San Jose Sharks
July 2, 2011	Rick Rypien	Winnipeg Jets	Vancouver Canucks
July 2, 2011	Ben Walter	Calgary Flames	Colorado Avalanche
July 2, 2011	Clay Wilson	Calgary Flames	Florida Panthers
July 2, 2011	Justin Soryal	Carolina Hurricanes	New York Rangers
July 2, 2011	Richard Petiot	Tampa Bay Lightning	Edmonton Oilers
July 2, 2011	Andrew Gordon	Anaheim Ducks	Washington Capitals
July 2, 2011	Matt Bradley	Florida Panthers	Washington Capitals
July 2, 2011	Greg Rallo	Florida Panthers	Dallas Stars
July 3, 2011	Mark Flood	Winnipeg Jets	Vancouver Canucks
July 3, 2011	Josh Green	Edmonton Oilers	Anaheim Ducks
July 3, 2011	Niclas Bergfors	Nashville Predators	Florida Panthers
July 3, 2011	Steve Pinizzotto	Vancouver Canucks	Washington Capitals
July 3, 2011	Boris Valabik	Pittsburgh Penguins	Boston Bruins
July 4, 2011	Brett Sterling	St. Louis Blues	Pittsburgh Penguins
July 4, 2011	Curtis McElhinney	Phoenix Coyotes	Ottawa Senators
July 4, 2011	Danny Richmond	Washington Capitals	Toronto Maple Leafs
July 4, 2011	Guillaume Desbiens	Calgary Flames	Vancouver Canucks
July 4, 2011	Alexandre Giroux	Columbus Blue Jackets	Edmonton Oilers
July 4, 2011	Ryan Keller	Edmonton Oilers	Ottawa Senators
July 4, 2011	Tyler Eckford	Phoenix Coyotes	New Jersey Devils
July 4, 2011	Aaron Gagnon	Winnipeg Jets	Dallas Stars
July 5, 2011	Scott Nichol	St. Louis Blues	San Jose Sharks
July 5, 2011	Zenon Konopka	Ottawa Senators	New York Islanders
July 5, 2011	Aaron Johnson	Columbus Blue Jackets	Nashville Predators
July 5, 2011	Alexandre Picard	Pittsburgh Penguins	Montreal Canadiens
July 5, 2011	Tomas Kaberle	Carolina Hurricanes	Boston Bruins
July 5, 2011	Nathan Lawson	Montreal Canadiens	New York Islanders
July 5, 2011	Jamie Tardif	Boston Bruins	Detroit Red Wings
July 5, 2011	Garnet Exelby	Detroit Red Wings	Chicago Blackhawks
July 5, 2011	Jeff Taffe	Minnesota Wild	Chicago Blackhawks
July 5, 2011	Kyle Wilson	Nashville Predators	Columbus Blue Jackets
July 5, 2011	Zack Stortini	Nashville Predators	Edmonton Oilers
July 5, 2011	Trevor Frischmon	New York Islanders	Columbus Blue Jackets
July 5, 2011	Trevor Smith	Tampa Bay Lightning	Columbus Blue Jackets
July 5, 2011	Bryan Rodney	Anaheim Ducks	Carolina Hurricanes
July 6, 2011	Jamie Langenbrunner	St. Louis Blues	Dallas Stars
July 6, 2011	Jason Arnott	St. Louis Blues	Washington Capitals
July 6, 2011	Tom Pyatt	Tampa Bay Lightning	Montreal Canadiens
July 6, 2011	Radek Martinek	Columbus Blue Jackets	New York Islanders
July 6, 2011	Jean-Francois Jacques	Anaheim Ducks	Edmonton Oilers
July 6, 2011	Philippe Dupuis	Toronto Maple Leafs	Colorado Avalanche
July 6, 2011	Nathan Oystrick	Phoenix Coyotes	St. Louis Blues
July 6, 2011	Dean Arsene	Phoenix Coyotes	St. Louis Blues
July 6, 2011	Matt Pelech	San Jose Sharks	Calgary Flames
July 7, 2011	Drew MacIntyre	Buffalo Sabres	Montreal Canadiens
July 7, 2011	Matt Climie	Vancouver Canucks	Phoenix Coyotes
July 7, 2011	Brian Willsie	Montreal Canadiens	Washington Capitals
July 7, 2011	Alexander Sulzer	Vancouver Canucks	Florida Panthers
July 7, 2011	Ryan Shannon	Tampa Bay Lightning	Ottawa Senators
July 7, 2011	Chris Conner	Detroit Red Wings	Pittsburgh Penguins
July 7, 2011	Alexandre Picard	Tampa Bay Lightning	Phoenix Coyotes
July 7, 2011	Jason Gregoire	Winnipeg Jets	New York Islanders
July 8, 2011	Jeff Deslauriers	Anaheim Ducks	Edmonton Oilers
July 8, 2011	Evan Brophey	Colorado Avalanche	Chicago Blackhawks
July 8, 2011	Cedrick Desjardins	Colorado Avalanche	Tampa Bay Lightning
July 8, 2011	Ben Guite	San Jose Sharks	Columbus Blue Jackets
July 9, 2011	Mike Lundin	Minnesota Wild	Tampa Bay Lightning
July 9, 2011	Mike McKenna	Ottawa Senators	New Jersey Devils
July 9, 2011	Mark Parrish	Ottawa Senators	Buffalo Sabres
July 9, 2011	Patrick Rissmiller	Colorado Avalanche	Florida Panthers
July 10, 2011	Christian Hanson	Washington Capitals	Toronto Maple Leafs
July 11, 2011	Lee Sweatt	Ottawa Senators	Vancouver Canucks
July 11, 2011	Tim Conboy	Ottawa Senators	Buffalo Sabres
July 11, 2011	Dane Byers	Columbus Blue Jackets	Phoenix Coyotes
July 11, 2011	Cody Bass	Columbus Blue Jackets	Ottawa Senators
July 12, 2011	Eric Godard	Dallas Stars	Pittsburgh Penguins
July 12, 2011	Tyson Strachan	Florida Panthers	St. Louis Blues
July 12, 2011	Steve MacIntyre	Pittsburgh Penguins	Edmonton Oilers
July 13, 2011	Derek Smith	Calgary Flames	Ottawa Senators
July 13, 2011	Shane O'Brien	Colorado Avalanche	Nashville Predators
July 14, 2011	Matt Smaby	Anaheim Ducks	Tampa Bay Lightning
July 14, 2011	Bracken Kearns	Florida Panthers	Phoenix Coyotes
July 15, 2011	Chris Durno	Carolina Hurricanes	Tampa Bay Lightning
July 15, 2011	Sami Lepisto	Chicago Blackhawks	Columbus Blue Jackets
July 16, 2011	Cam Janssen	New Jersey Devils	St. Louis Blues
July 17, 2011	Eric Boulton	New Jersey Devils	Winnipeg Jets
July 18, 2011	Jason Jaffray	Winnipeg Jets	Anaheim Ducks
July 19, 2011	Kyle Chipchura	Phoenix Coyotes	Anaheim Ducks
July 19, 2011	Andrew Murray	San Jose Sharks	Columbus Blue Jackets
July 19, 2011	Jason Bacashihua	Philadelphia Flyers	Colorado Avalanche
July 20, 2011	Ty Conklin	Detroit Red Wings	St. Louis Blues
July 21, 2011	Tim Wallace	New York Islanders	Pittsburgh Penguins
July 23, 2011	Vaclav Prospal	Columbus Blue Jackets	New York Rangers
July 25, 2011	Byron Bitz	Vancouver Canucks	Florida Panthers
July 26, 2011	Jason Williams	Pittsburgh Penguins	Dallas Stars
July 26, 2011	Justin Pogge	Phoenix Coyotes	Carolina Hurricanes
July 28, 2011	Tyler Sloan	Nashville Predators	Washington Capitals
August 3, 2011	Colin White	San Jose Sharks	New Jersey Devils
August 5, 2011	Patrick O'Sullivan	Phoenix Coyotes	Minnesota Wild
August 8, 2011	Jack Hillen	Nashville Predators	New York Islanders
August 8, 2011	Sean Backman	New York Islanders	Dallas Stars
August 9, 2011	Paul Szczechura	Buffalo Sabres	Tampa Bay Lightning
August 9, 2011	Michael Ryan	Buffalo Sabres	Philadelphia Flyers
August 9, 2011	Danny Syvret	St. Louis Blues	Philadelphia Flyers
August 13, 2011	Scott Hannan	Calgary Flames	Washington Capitals
August 15, 2011	Jeff Woywitka	Montreal Canadiens	Dallas Stars
August 20, 2011	Ethan Moreau	Los Angeles Kings	Columbus Blue Jackets
August 22, 2011	Peter Harrold	New Jersey Devils	Los Angeles Kings
September 2, 2011	Brandon Segal	Chicago Blackhawks	Dallas Stars
September 10, 2011	Kyle Wellwood	Winnipeg Jets	San Jose Sharks
September 14, 2011	Mathieu Roy	Carolina Hurricanes	Tampa Bay Lightning
September 23, 2011	Mike Modano	Dallas Stars	Detroit Red Wings
September 26, 2011	Chris Campoli	Montreal Canadiens	Chicago Blackhawks
September 30, 2011	Steve Staios	New York Islanders	Calgary Flames
September 30, 2011	Trent Hunter	Los Angeles Kings	New Jersey Devils
September 30, 2011	Scott Valentine	Nashville Predators	Anaheim Ducks
October 3, 2011	Ray Emery	Chicago Blackhawks	Anaheim Ducks
October 3, 2011	Brad Winchester	San Jose Sharks	Anaheim Ducks
October 3, 2011	Fabian Brunnstrom	Detroit Red Wings	Toronto Maple Leafs
October 7, 2011	Joe Callahan	Montreal Canadiens	Florida Panthers
October 12, 2011	Troy Bodie	Anaheim Ducks	Carolina Hurricanes
November 4, 2011	Anton Stralman	New York Rangers	Columbus Blue Jackets
December 12, 2011	Antti Miettinen	Tampa Bay Lightning	Minnesota Wild
January 4, 2012	John Madden	Florida Panthers	Minnesota Wild
January 19, 2012	Brett Lebda	Columbus Blue Jackets	Nashville Predators
January 30, 2012	Steve Bernier	New Jersey Devils	Florida Panthers
March 5, 2012	Marty Turco	Boston Bruins	Chicago Blackhawks
March 12, 2012	John Grahame	New York Islanders	Colorado Avalanche
June 30, 2012	Justin Schultz	Edmonton Oilers	Anaheim Ducks

=== Imports ===
Date	Player	New team	Previous team	League
July 1, 2011	Carter Bancks	Calgary Flames	Abbotsford Heat	AHL
July 1, 2011	Joe Piskula	Calgary Flames	Abbotsford Heat	AHL
July 1, 2011	Brett McLean	Chicago Blackhawks	SC Bern	NLA
July 1, 2011	Ryan Garbutt	Dallas Stars	Chicago Wolves	AHL
July 1, 2011	Jaromir Jagr	Philadelphia Flyers	Avangard Omsk	KHL
July 1, 2011	Michel Ouellet	Tampa Bay Lightning	Hamburg Freezers	DEL
July 2, 2011	Jordie Benn	Dallas Stars	Texas Stars	AHL
July 2, 2011	Greg Rallo	Florida Panthers	Texas Stars	AHL
July 4, 2011	Yann Danis	Edmonton Oilers	Amur Khabarovsk	KHL
July 5, 2011	Josh Hennessy	Boston Bruins	HC Lugano	NLA
July 5, 2011	Peter Delmas	Montreal Canadiens	Hamilton Bulldogs	AHL
July 11, 2011	Martin St. Pierre	Columbus Blue Jackets	EC Red Bull Salzburg	EBEL
July 12, 2011	Jonathan Cheechoo	St. Louis Blues	Worcester Sharks	AHL
July 13, 2011	Scott Munroe	Pittsburgh Penguins	HC Neftekhimik Nizhnekamsk	KHL
July 14, 2011	Jacob Micflikier	Washington Capitals	Charlotte Checkers	AHL
July 20, 2011	Mark Bell	Anaheim Ducks	Kloten Flyers	NLA
July 29, 2011	Stephane Veilleux	New Jersey Devils	HC Ambri-Piotta	NLA
August 3, 2011	Brendan Bell	New York Rangers	EHC Biel	NLA
August 16, 2011	Andre Deveaux	New York Rangers	Chicago Wolves	AHL
August 22, 2011	Matt Anderson	New Jersey Devils	Albany Devils	AHL
September 8, 2011	Richard Park	Pittsburgh Penguins	Geneve-Servette HC	NLA
September 14, 2011	Blake Kessel	Philadelphia Flyers	New Hampshire Wildcats	NCAA
September 22, 2011	Turner Elson	Calgary Flames	Red Deer Rebels	WHL
September 22, 2011	James Martin	Calgary Flames	Kootenay Ice	WHL
September 23, 2011	Dan Milan	Tampa Bay Lightning	Moncton Wildcats	QMJHL
September 26, 2011	Cam Paddock	Los Angeles Kings	Iserlohn Roosters	DEL
September 26, 2011	Alex Roach	Los Angeles Kings	Calgary Hitmen	WHL
October 4, 2011	Jay Pandolfo	New York Islanders	Springfield Falcons	AHL
October 5, 2011	Petr Sykora	New Jersey Devils	HC Dinamo Minsk	KHL
October 7, 2011	Jonathan Parker	Buffalo Sabres	Prince Albert Raiders	WHL
October 21, 2011	Kevan Miller	Boston Bruins	Providence Bruins	AHL
November 16, 2011	Kris Fredheim	Minnesota Wild	Houston Aeros	AHL
November 28, 2011	Joe Finley	Buffalo Sabres	Rochester Americans	AHL
December 29, 2011	Pierre-Cedric Labrie	Tampa Bay Lightning	Norfolk Admirals	AHL
January 30, 2012	Joel Rechlicz	Washington Capitals	Hershey Bears	AHL
February 1, 2012	Krys Kolanos	Calgary Flames	Abbotsford Heat	AHL
February 23, 2012	Carter Hutton	Chicago Blackhawks	Rockford IceHogs	AHL
March 1, 2012	Adam Payerl	Pittsburgh Penguins	Belleville Bulls	OHL
March 1, 2012	Cory Conacher	Tampa Bay Lightning	Norfolk Admirals	AHL
March 2, 2012	Brendan Shinnimin	Phoenix Coyotes	Tri-City Americans	WHL
March 3, 2012	Danick Gauthier	Tampa Bay Lightning	Saint John Sea Dogs	QMJHL
March 6, 2012	Cal Heeter	Philadelphia Flyers	Ohio State Buckeyes	NCAA
March 10, 2012	Jack MacLellan	Nashville Predators	Brown Bears	NCAA
March 11, 2012	Mike Halmo	New York Islanders	Owen Sound Attack	OHL
March 12, 2012	Cole Schneider	Ottawa Senators	UConn Huskies	NCAA
March 14, 2012	Sebastian Stalberg	San Jose Sharks	Vermont Catamounts	NCAA
March 15, 2012	Brian O'Neill	Los Angeles Kings	Yale Bulldogs	NCAA
March 16, 2012	Adam Morrison	Boston Bruins	Vancouver Giants	WHL
March 19, 2012	Terry Broadhurst	Chicago Blackhawks	Nebraska–Omaha Mavericks	NCAA
March 19, 2012	Sebastien Caron	Tampa Bay Lightning	Iserlohn Roosters	DEL
March 20, 2012	David Eddy	Calgary Flames	St. Cloud State Huskies	NCAA
March 23, 2012	Scott Arnold	Phoenix Coyotes	Niagara Purple Eagles	NCAA
March 25, 2012	Torey Krug	Boston Bruins	Michigan State Spartans	NCAA
March 27, 2012	Cameron Schilling	Washington Capitals	Miami RedHawks	NCAA
March 28, 2012	J.T. Brown	Tampa Bay Lightning	Minnesota Duluth Bulldogs	NCAA
March 28, 2012	Spencer Abbott	Toronto Maple Leafs	Maine Black Bears	NCAA
March 29, 2012	Brady Lamb	Calgary Flames	Minnesota Duluth Bulldogs	NCAA
March 29, 2012	Shawn Hunwick	Columbus Blue Jackets	Michigan Wolverines	NCAA
March 30, 2012	Travis Oleksuk	San Jose Sharks	Minnesota Duluth Bulldogs	NCAA
March 30, 2012	Matt Tennyson	San Jose Sharks	Western Michigan Broncos	NCAA
April 2, 2012	Matt Konan	Philadelphia Flyers	Medicine Hat Tigers	WHL
April 2, 2012	Matt Mangene	Philadelphia Flyers	Maine Black Bears	NCAA
April 5, 2012	Jeremy Welsh	Carolina Hurricanes	Union Dutchmen	NCAA
April 13, 2012	Peter LeBlanc	Chicago Blackhawks	Rockford IceHogs	AHL
April 23, 2012	Beau Schmitz	Carolina Hurricanes	Plymouth Whalers	OHL
May 1, 2012	Mark Louis	Phoenix Coyotes	Portland Pirates	AHL
May 2, 2012	Roman Cervenka	Calgary Flames	Avangard Omsk	KHL
May 3, 2012	John Mitchell	Anaheim Ducks	Syracuse Crunch	AHL
May 21, 2012	Viktor Fasth	Anaheim Ducks	AIK IF	SEL
May 21, 2012	Andrew Johnston	Philadelphia Flyers	Humboldt Broncos	SJHL
May 29, 2012	Niklas Svedberg	Boston Bruins	Brynas IF	SEL
May 30, 2012	Joonas Jarvinen	Nashville Predators	Lahti Pelicans	SM-liiga
May 30, 2012	Marek Hrivik	New York Rangers	Moncton Wildcats	QMJHL
May 31, 2012	Ryan Lasch	Anaheim Ducks	Lahti Pelicans	SM-liiga
June 1, 2012	Daniel Bang	Nashville Predators	AIK IF	SEL
June 1, 2012	Blair Riley	New York Islanders	Springfield Falcons	AHL
June 5, 2012	Cristopher Nihlstorp	Dallas Stars	Farjestad BK	SEL
June 7, 2012	John Muse	Carolina Hurricanes	Charlotte Checkers	AHL
June 14, 2012	Jason DeSantis	Florida Panthers	St. John's IceCaps	AHL
June 16, 2012	Harri Pesonen	New Jersey Devils	JYP	SM-liiga

== Trades ==
=== July ===
July 1, 2011	To Colorado Avalanche Semyon Varlamov	To Washington Capitals 1st-round pick in 2012 (#11 - Filip Forsberg) conditional 2nd-round pick^{1} (2012 - DAL - #54 - Mike Winther)^{2}
July 1, 2011	To Florida Panthers Kris Versteeg	To Philadelphia Flyers conditional 2nd-round pick^{3} (2012 - TBL - #53 - Mike Winther)^{4} 3rd-round pick in 2012 (#78 - Shayne Gostisbehere)
July 1, 2011	To Anaheim Ducks Kurtis Foster	To Edmonton Oilers Andy Sutton
July 2, 2011	To Nashville Predators Brodie Dupont	To New York Rangers Andreas Thuresson
July 3, 2011	To Toronto Maple Leafs Matthew Lombardi; Cody Franson conditional 4th-round pick in 2013^{5}	To Nashville Predators Brett Lebda; Robert Slaney conditional 4th-round pick in 2013^{5}
July 3, 2011	To Minnesota Wild Dany Heatley	To San Jose Sharks Martin Havlat
July 5, 2011	To Boston Bruins Joe Corvo	To Carolina Hurricanes 4th-round pick in 2012 (#115 - Trevor Carrick)
July 7, 2011	To Montreal Canadiens Mike Blunden	To Columbus Blue Jackets Ryan Russell
July 8, 2011	To Winnipeg Jets Eric Fehr	To Washington Capitals Danick Paquette; 4th-round pick in 2012 (#100 - Thomas Di Pauli)
July 9, 2011	To Florida Panthers Angelo Esposito	To Winnipeg Jets Kenndal McArdle
July 9, 2011	To Florida Panthers Sergei Shirokov	To Vancouver Canucks Mike Duco
July 9, 2011	To Calgary Flames Jordan Henry	To Florida Panthers Keith Seabrook
July 12, 2011	To Anaheim Ducks Andrew Cogliano	To Edmonton Oilers 2nd-round pick in 2013 (#56 - Marc-Olivier Roy)
July 14, 2011	To Calgary Flames Pierre-Luc Letourneau-Leblond	To New Jersey Devils 5th-round pick in 2012 (#135 - Graham Black)
July 15, 2011	To Anaheim Ducks Mathieu Carle	To Montreal Canadiens Mark Mitera
July 28, 2011	To New York Islanders Brian Rolston	To New Jersey Devils Trent Hunter

1. The condition of this pick was a Washington choice in the 2012 entry draft or 2013 entry draft. Washington opted to take this pick on June 15, 2012.
2. Washington's acquired second-round pick went to Dallas as the result of a trade on June 22, 2012, that sent Mike Ribeiro to Washington in exchange for Cody Eakin and this pick.
3. The condition of this pick was a Florida choice in the 2012 entry draft or 2013 entry draft. Florida opted to take this pick on June 23, 2012.
4. Philadelphia's acquired second-round pick went to Tampa Bay as the result of a trade on February 18, 2012, that sent Pavel Kubina to Philadelphia in exchange for a fourth-round pick in 2013, Jon Kalinski and this pick.
5. The condition of these picks was if Lombardi plays less than 60 regular-season games in the 2011–12 NHL season and 2012–13 NHL season. The condition was not met when Lombardi played in his 60th game on April 3rd, 2012 during the 2011–12 NHL season.

=== August ===
August 6, 2011	To San Jose Sharks James Sheppard	To Minnesota Wild 3rd-round pick in 2013 (#81 - Kurtis Gabriel)
August 29, 2011	To Phoenix Coyotes Daymond Langkow	To Calgary Flames Lee Stempniak

=== September ===
September 8, 2011	To Phoenix Coyotes Marc Cheverie	To Florida Panthers Justin Bernhardt
September 9, 2011	To Chicago Blackhawks David Toews	To New York Islanders future considerations

=== October ===
October 4, 2011	To Toronto Maple Leafs Dave Steckel	To New Jersey Devils 4th-round pick in 2012 (#96 - Ben Thomson)
October 8, 2011	To Anaheim Ducks Kyle Cumiskey	To Colorado Avalanche Jake Newton conditional pick^{1} (2013 - SJS - 7th-round - #207 - Emil Galimov)^{2}
October 12, 2011	To Los Angeles Kings Stefan Legein; 6th-round pick in 2012 (#171 - Tomas Hyka)	To Philadelphia Flyers future considerations
October 12, 2011	To Dallas Stars Eric Nystrom	To Minnesota Wild future considerations
October 22, 2011	To Florida Panthers Mikael Samuelsson; Marco Sturm	To Vancouver Canucks David Booth; Steven Reinprecht; 3rd-round pick in 2013 (#85 - Cole Cassels)
October 23, 2011	To Montreal Canadiens Petteri Nokelainen; Garrett Stafford	To Phoenix Coyotes Brock Trotter; 7th-round pick in 2012 (#184 - Marek Langhamer)
October 28, 2011	To Phoenix Coyotes Cal O'Reilly	To Nashville Predators 4th-round pick in 2012 (#118 - Mikko Vainonen)

1. The condition was Colorado would receive a fifth-round pick in 2012 if Cumiskey plays 45 games or more or a seventh-round pick the 2013 if he plays in less than 45 games in the 2011–12 regular season games for Anaheim – converted on January 4, 2012, when Cumiskey did not play in Anaheim's first 38 games of the season.
2. Colorado's acquired seventh-round pick went to San Jose as the result of a trade on February 27, 2012, that sent Jamie McGinn, Mike Connolly and Michael Sgarbossa to Colorado in exchange for Daniel Winnik, TJ Galiardi and this pick.

=== November ===
November 8, 2011	To Washington Capitals Tomas Kundratek	To New York Rangers Francois Bouchard
November 8, 2011	To Columbus Blue Jackets Mark Letestu	To Pittsburgh Penguins 4th-round pick in 2012 (#92 - Matia Marcantuoni)
November 10, 2011	To St. Louis Blues Kris Russell	To Columbus Blue Jackets Nikita Nikitin

=== December ===
December 2, 2011	To Ottawa Senators Rob Klinkhammer	To Chicago Blackhawks conditional 7th-round pick in 2013^{1} (CGY - #198 - John Gilmour)^{2}
December 2, 2011	To Florida Panthers James Wright; Michael Vernace	To Tampa Bay Lightning Michael Kostka; Evan Oberg
December 7, 2011	To Florida Panthers Krys Barch; 6th-round pick in 2012 (NSH - #164 - Simon Fernholm)^{3}	To Dallas Stars Jake Hauswirth; 5th-round pick in 2012 (#144 - Henri Kiviaho)
December 9, 2011	To Montreal Canadiens Tomas Kaberle	To Carolina Hurricanes Jaroslav Spacek
December 12, 2011	To New Jersey Devils Kurtis Foster; Timo Pielmeier	To Anaheim Ducks Rod Pelley; Mark Fraser; 7th-round pick in 2012 (#210 - Jaycob Megna)
December 16, 2011	To Ottawa Senators Kyle Turris	To Phoenix Coyotes David Rundblad; 2nd-round pick in 2012 (PHI - #45 - Anthony Stolarz)^{4}

1. The condition was if Klinkhammer plays at least five 2011–12 regular season games for Ottawa – converted on March 14, 2012, when Klinkhammer appeared in a game against the Montreal Canadiens.
2. Chicago's acquired seventh-round pick went to Calgary as the result of a trade on January 21, 2013, that sent Henrik Karlsson to Chicago in exchange for this pick.
3. Florida's acquired sixth-round pick went to the Nashville as the result of a trade on February 24, 2012, that sent Jerred Smithson to Florida in exchange for this pick.
4. Columbus' acquired second-round pick went to Philadelphia as a result of a trade on June 22, 2012, that sent Sergei Bobrovsky to Columbus in exchange for a fourth-round pick in 2012, a fourth round pick in 2013, and this pick.
  Columbus previously acquired this pick as a result of a trade on February 22, 2012, that sent Antoine Vermette to Phoenix in exchange for Curtis McElhinney, a conditional fourth-round pick in 2013 and this pick.

=== January ===
January 3, 2012	To Anaheim Ducks Luca Caputi	To Toronto Maple Leafs Nicolas Deschamps
January 6, 2012	To Tampa Bay Lightning Brendan Mikkelson	To Calgary Flames Blair Jones
January 12, 2012	To Calgary Flames Michael Cammalleri; Karri Ramo; 5th-round pick in 2012 (#124 - Ryan Culkin)	To Montreal Canadiens Rene Bourque; Patrick Holland; 2nd-round pick in 2013 (#36 - Zachary Fucale)
January 13, 2012	To Dallas Stars Angelo Esposito	To Florida Panthers Ondrej Roman
January 18, 2012	To Carolina Hurricanes Evgenii Dadonov; A.J. Jenks	To Florida Panthers Jon Matsumoto; Mattias Lindstrom
January 20, 2012	To New Jersey Devils Alexei Ponikarovsky	To Carolina Hurricanes Joe Sova; 4th-round pick in 2012 (#120 - Jaccob Slavin)
January 26, 2012	To San Jose Sharks Tim Kennedy	To Florida Panthers Sean Sullivan
January 27, 2012	To Chicago Blackhawks Brendan Morrison	To Calgary Flames Brian Connelly
January 30, 2012	To Winnipeg Jets John Negrin	To Calgary Flames Akim Aliu

=== February ===
February 2, 2012	To Washington Capitals Kevin Marshall	To Philadelphia Flyers Matt Ford
February 2, 2012	To Colorado Avalanche Danny Richmond	To Washington Capitals Mike Carman
February 3, 2012	To New York Rangers Casey Wellman	To Minnesota Wild Erik Christensen conditional 7th-round pick in 2013^{1} (#200 - Alexandre Belanger)
February 13, 2012	To Anaheim Ducks Riley Holzapfel	To Winnipeg Jets Maxime Macenauer
February 16, 2012	To Anaheim Ducks Ryan O'Marra	To Edmonton Oilers Bryan Rodney
February 16, 2012	To Philadelphia Flyers Nicklas Grossmann	To Dallas Stars 2nd-round pick in 2012 (#61 - Devin Shore); 3rd-round pick in 2013 (PIT - #77 - Jake Guentzel)^{2}
February 16, 2012	To San Jose Sharks Dominic Moore; 7th-round pick in 2012 (CHI - #191 - Brandon Whitney)^{3}	To Tampa Bay Lightning 2nd-round pick in 2012 (NSH - #37 - Pontus Aberg)^{4}
February 17, 2012	To Nashville Predators Hal Gill conditional 5th-round pick in 2013^{5} (LAK - #146 - Patrik Bartosak)^{6}	To Montreal Canadiens Blake Geoffrion; Robert Slaney; 2nd-round pick in 2012 (#51 - Dalton Thrower)
February 18, 2012	To Philadelphia Flyers Pavel Kubina	To Tampa Bay Lightning Jon Kalinski conditional 2nd-round pick^{7} (2012 - #53 - Brian Hart); 4th-round pick in 2013 (OTT - #102 - Tobias Lindberg)^{8}
February 21, 2012	To Colorado Avalanche Steve Downie	To Tampa Bay Lightning Kyle Quincey
February 21, 2012	To Detroit Red Wings Kyle Quincey	To Tampa Bay Lightning Sebastien Piche; 1st-round pick in 2012 (#19 - Andrei Vasilevskiy)
February 21, 2012	To Tampa Bay Lightning Brandon Segal	To Chicago Blackhawks Matt Fornataro
February 22, 2012	To Phoenix Coyotes Antoine Vermette	To Columbus Blue Jackets Curtis McElhinney; 2nd-round pick in 2012 (PHI - #45 - Anthony Stolarz)^{9} conditional pick - 2013^{10} (LAK - #103 - Justin Auger)^{11}
February 23, 2012	To Los Angeles Kings Jeff Carter	To Columbus Blue Jackets Jack Johnson conditional 1st-round pick^{12} (2013 - #27 - Marko Dano)
February 24, 2012	To Florida Panthers Jerred Smithson	To Nashville Predators 6th-round pick in 2012 (#164 - Simon Fernholm)
February 24, 2012	To New Jersey Devils Marek Zidlicky	To Minnesota Wild Kurtis Foster; Nick Palmieri; Stephane Veilleux; 2nd-round pick in 2012 (#46 - Raphael Bussieres) conditional 3rd-round pick in 2013^{13} (NYI - #70 - Eamon McAdam)^{14}
February 25, 2012	To Florida Panthers Wojtek Wolski	To New York Rangers Michael Vernace; 3rd-round pick in 2013 (PHX - #62 - Yan-Pavel Laplante)^{15}
February 26, 2012	To Ottawa Senators Ben Bishop	To St. Louis Blues 2nd-round pick in 2013 (#47 - Tommy Vannelli)
February 27, 2012	To Tampa Bay Lightning Keith Aulie	To Toronto Maple Leafs Carter Ashton
February 27, 2012	To Edmonton Oilers Nick Schultz	To Minnesota Wild Tom Gilbert
February 27, 2012	To Tampa Bay Lightning Mike Commodore	To Detroit Red Wings conditional 7th-round pick in 2013^{16}
February 27, 2012	To Nashville Predators Andrei Kostitsyn	To Montreal Canadiens 2nd-round draft pick in 2013 (#47 - Jacob de la Rose) conditional 5th-round draft pick in 2013^{17} (LAK - #146 - Patrik Bartošák)^{18}
February 27, 2012	To Ottawa Senators Matt Gilroy	To Tampa Bay Lightning Brian Lee
February 27, 2012	To Vancouver Canucks Samuel Påhlsson	To Columbus Blue Jackets Taylor Ellington; 4th-round draft pick in 2012 (#95 - Josh Anderson)^{19} 4th-round draft pick in 2012 (PHI - #117 - Taylor Leier)^{20}
February 27, 2012	To Chicago Blackhawks Johnny Oduya	To Winnipeg Jets 2nd-round draft pick in 2013 (WAS - #61 - Zach Sanford)^{21} 3rd-round draft pick in 2013 (#91 - JC Lipon)
February 27, 2012	To San Jose Sharks Daniel Winnik; TJ Galiardi; ANA 7th-round draft pick in 2013	To Colorado Avalanche Jamie McGinn; Mike Connolly; Michael Sgarbossa
February 27, 2012	To Boston Bruins Brian Rolston; Mike Mottau	To New York Islanders Yannick Riendeau; Marc Cantin
February 27, 2012	To Nashville Predators Paul Gaustad; 4th-round draft pick in 2013	To Buffalo Sabres 1st-round draft pick in 2012
February 27, 2012	To Boston Bruins Greg Zanon	To Minnesota Wild Steven Kampfer
February 27, 2012	To New York Rangers John Scott	To Chicago Blackhawks 5th-round draft pick in 2012
February 27, 2012	To Toronto Maple Leafs Mark Fraser	To Anaheim Ducks Dale Mitchell
February 27, 2012	To Buffalo Sabres Cody Hodgson; Alexander Sulzer	To Vancouver Canucks Zack Kassian; Marc-Andre Gragnani
February 27, 2012	To Vancouver Canucks Andrew Gordon	To Anaheim Ducks Sebastian Erixon

1. The condition was if Christensen was re-signed by Minnesota for the 2012–13 NHL season - converted on June 5, 2012, when Christensen signed with HC Lev Praha of the KHL.
2. Dallas' acquired third-round pick went to Pittsburgh as the result of a trade on March 24, 2013, that sent Joe Morrow and a fifth-round pick in the 2013 entry draft to Dallas in exchange for Brenden Morrow and this pick (being conditional at the time of the trade). The condition was Pittsburgh will receive the lower of either Edmonton or Minnesota's previously acquired third-round picks, via Dallas – converted on April 21, 2013.
3. San Jose's acquired seventh-round pick went to Chicago as the result of a trade on June 23, 2012, that sent a fourth-round pick in 2012 to San Jose in exchange for a fourth-round pick in 2013 and this pick.
4. Tampa Bay's acquired second-round pick went to Nashville as the result of a trade on June 15, 2012, that sent Anders Lindback, Kyle Wilson and a seventh-round pick in the 2012 entry draft to Tampa Bay in exchange for Sebastien Caron, a second-round pick in the 2012 entry draft, a third-round pick in the 2013 entry draft and this pick.
5. The condition of this pick was if Geoffrion played 40 NHL games in the 2012–13 NHL season.
6. Montreal's fifth-round pick went to Los Angeles as the result of a trade on April 2, 2013, that sent Davis Drewiske to Montreal in exchange for this pick.
  Montreal re-acquired this pick as the result of a trade on February 27, 2012, that sent Andrei Kostitsyn to Nashville in exchange for a second-round pick in the 2013 entry draft and this pick.
7. Philadelphia had previously acquired this pick as the result of a trade on July 1, 2011, that sent Kris Versteeg to Florida in exchange for a third-round pick in 2012 and a Florida's choice of a second-round pick in the 2012 Entry Draft (this pick) or 2013 entry draft. Florida opted to take this pick on June 23, 2012.
8. Tampa Bay's acquired fourth-round pick went to Ottawa as the result of a trade on April 3, 2013, that sent Ben Bishop to Tampa Bay in exchange for Cory Conacher and this pick.
9. Columbus' acquired second-round pick went to Philadelphia as a result of a trade on June 22, 2012, that sent Sergei Bobrovsky to Columbus in exchange for a fourth-round pick in 2012, a fourth round pick in 2013, and this pick.
10. The condition was if Phoenix wins at least one round in the 2012 Stanley Cup playoffs – converted on April 23, 2012.
11. Philadelphia's acquired fourth-round pick went to Los Angeles as the result of a trade on February 26, 2013, that sent Simon Gagne to Philadelphia in exchange for this pick (being conditional at the time of the trade). The condition was Los Angeles will receive a fourth-round pick in 2013 if Philadelphia fails to make the 2013 Stanley Cup Playoffs – converted on April 19, 2013.
  Philadelphia previously acquired this pick as a result of a trade on June 22, 2012, that sent Sergei Bobrovsky to Columbus in exchange for a second-round pick and a fourth-round pick in 2012 along with this pick.
12. The conditions of this pick was Columbus would get Los Angeles' first-round pick in the 2013 entry draft if Los Angeles does not make the playoffs in the 2011–12 NHL season. If Los Angeles makes the playoffs, Columbus gets the choice of the first-round pick in the 2012 entry draft or 2013 entry draft. One condition was converted on April 5, 2012, when Los Angeles qualified for the 2012 Stanley Cup playoffs, giving Columbus the right to choose between Los Angeles' first-round picks in either 2012 or 2013. The other condition was converted on June 22, 2012, when Columbus chose not to take Los Angeles' first round pick in 2012, giving them this pick.
13. The conditions were if New Jersey makes the Eastern Conference Finals of the 2012 Stanley Cup playoffs and Zidlicky plays in 75 percent of New Jersey's games in the first two rounds – converted on May 9, 2012.
14. Minnesota's acquired third-round pick went to the Islanders as the result of a trade on June 30, 2013, that sent Nino Niederreiter to Minnesota in exchange for Cal Clutterbuck and this pick.
15. San Jose's acquired third-round pick went to Phoenix as the result of a trade on April 3, 2013, that sent Raffi Torres to San Jose in exchange for this pick.
  San Jose previously acquired this pick as the result of a trade on April 2, 2013, that sent Ryane Clowe to the Rangers in exchange for a second-round pick in 2013, a conditional second-round pick in 2014 and this pick.
16. The conditions of this pick were that Detroit would receive a seventh-round pick in the 2013 entry draft if Tampa Bay makes the 2012 Stanley Cup playoffs and Commodore plays in 15 regular season games in the 2011–12 NHL season. The conditions were not met as Tampa Bay missed the playoffs and Commodore played in 13 games.
17. Nashville previously acquired this pick as the result of a trade on February 17, 2012, that sent Blake Geoffrion, Robert Slaney and a second-round pick in the 2012 entry draft to Montreal in exchange for Hal Gill and this pick being conditional at the time of the trade. The condition of this pick was if Geoffrion played 40 NHL games in the 2012–13 NHL season. The conditions effectively removed after subsequent trade.
18. Montreal's fifth-round pick went to Los Angeles as the result of a trade on April 2, 2013, that sent Davis Drewiske to Montreal in exchange for this pick.
19. Vancouver previously acquired this pick as the result of a trade on June 28, 2011, that sent Christian Ehrhoff to the Islanders in exchange for this pick.
20. Columbus' acquired fourth-round pick went to Philadelphia as a result of a trade on June 22, 2012, that sent Sergei Bobrovsky to Columbus in exchange for a second-round pick in 2012, a fourth-round pick in 2013, and this pick.
21. Winnipeg's acquired second-round pick went to Washington as the result of a trade on June 30, 2013, that sent a third-round (84th overall), a fourth-round pick (114th overall) and a fifth-round pick (127th overall) in the 2013 entry draft to Winnipeg in exchange for this pick.

=== March ===
March 20, 2012	To New York Islanders Yuri Alexandrov	To Boston Bruins future considerations

=== May ===
May 26, 2012	To Boston Bruins Chris Bourque	To Washington Capitals Zach Hamill

=== June ===
June 4, 2012	To Pittsburgh Penguins Tomas Vokoun	To Washington Capitals 7th-round pick in 2012
June 10, 2012	To San Jose Sharks Brad Stuart	To Detroit Red Wings Andrew Murray conditional 7th-round pick in 2014
June 15, 2012	To Tampa Bay Lightning Anders Lindback; Kyle Wilson; 7th-round pick in 2012	To Nashville Predators Sebastien Caron; MIN 2nd-round pick in 2012; PHI 2nd-round pick in 2012; 3rd-round pick in 2013

== Waivers ==
Once an NHL player has played in a certain number of games or a set number of seasons has passed since the signing of his first NHL contract (see here), that player must be offered to all of the other NHL teams before he can be assigned to a minor league affiliate.

Date	Player	New team	Previous team
September 29, 2011	Nick Johnson	Minnesota Wild	Pittsburgh Penguins
October 4, 2011	Dale Weise	Vancouver Canucks	New York Rangers
October 5, 2011 October 9, 2011	Blair Betts claim reversed^{a}	Montreal Canadiens Philadelphia Flyers	Philadelphia Flyers Montreal Canadiens
October 6, 2011	Jeff Woywitka	New York Rangers	Montreal Canadiens
October 6, 2011	Brett MacLean	Winnipeg Jets	Phoenix Coyotes
October 11, 2011	Taylor Chorney	St. Louis Blues	Edmonton Oilers
October 11, 2011	Brian McGrattan	Nashville Predators	Anaheim Ducks
October 26, 2011	Ryan Carter	New Jersey Devils	Florida Panthers
October 29, 2011	Brett MacLean	Phoenix Coyotes	Winnipeg Jets
November 10, 2011	Ben Maxwell	Anaheim Ducks	Winnipeg Jets
November 10, 2011	Taylor Chorney	Edmonton Oilers	St. Louis Blues
November 14, 2011	Niklas Hagman	Anaheim Ducks	Calgary Flames
November 25, 2011	Blake Comeau	Calgary Flames	New York Islanders
November 29, 2011	Andreas Nodl	Carolina Hurricanes	Philadelphia Flyers
December 6, 2011	Ben Maxwell	Winnipeg Jets	Anaheim Ducks
December 13, 2011	Antti Miettinen	Winnipeg Jets	Tampa Bay Lightning
January 10, 2012	Gilbert Brule	Phoenix Coyotes	Edmonton Oilers
January 14, 2012	Colton Gillies	Columbus Blue Jackets	Minnesota Wild
January 19, 2012	Brandon Yip	Nashville Predators	Colorado Avalanche
February 1, 2012	Cal O'Reilly	Pittsburgh Penguins	Phoenix Coyotes
February 23, 2012	Tim Wallace	Tampa Bay Lightning	New York Islanders
February 25, 2012	Darryl Boyce	Columbus Blue Jackets	Toronto Maple Leafs
February 27, 2012	Grant Clitsome	Winnipeg Jets	Columbus Blue Jackets
February 27, 2012	Brad Staubitz	Montreal Canadiens	Minnesota Wild

a.The Montreal Canadiens cancelled the waiver claim on Betts and returned him to the Philadelphia Flyers, after he failed his physical.

== See also ==
- 2011 NHL entry draft
- 2012 NHL entry draft
- 2011 in sports
- 2012 in sports
- 2010–11 NHL transactions
- 2012–13 NHL transactions
