= 2012 NHL entry draft =

2012 North American ice hockey draft

General information
- Date: June 22–23, 2012
- Location: Consol Energy Center; Pittsburgh, Pennsylvania, U.S.

Overview
- 211 total selections in 7 rounds
- First selection: (Russia) Nail Yakupov (Edmonton Oilers)

The 2012 NHL entry draft was the 50th draft for the National Hockey League. It was held on June 22–23, 2012, at Consol Energy Center in Pittsburgh. It was the first time that Pittsburgh hosted the draft since the 1997 NHL entry draft. The top three selections were Nail Yakupov by the Edmonton Oilers, Ryan Murray by the Columbus Blue Jackets, and Alex Galchenyuk by the Montreal Canadiens.

As of 2026, there are 50 active NHL players from this draft.

== Eligibility ==
Ice hockey players born between January 1, 1992, and September 15, 1994, were eligible for selection in the 2012 NHL entry draft. Additionally, un-drafted, non-North American players over the age of 20 are eligible for the draft; and those players who were drafted in the 2010 NHL entry draft, but not signed by an NHL team and who were born after June 24, 1992, were also eligible to re-enter the draft.

== Draft lottery ==
The NHL draft lottery enables a team to move up to four spots ahead in the draft. Thus, only the bottom five teams were eligible to receive the number one draft pick. Beginning with the 2013 NHL entry draft all fourteen teams not qualifying for the Stanley Cup playoffs will have a "weighted" chance at winning the first overall selection. The Edmonton Oilers won the 2012 draft lottery that took place on April 10, 2012, thus moving them up from the second pick to the first pick.

== Top prospects ==
Source: NHL Central Scouting final (April 9, 2012) ranking.

Ranking	North American skaters	European skaters
1	(Russia) Nail Yakupov (RW)	(Sweden) Filip Forsberg (RW)
2	(Canada) Ryan Murray (D)	(Finland) Teuvo Teravainen (LW)
3	(Russia) Mikhail Grigorenko (C)	(Sweden) Sebastian Collberg (RW)
4	(United States) Alex Galchenyuk (C)	(Sweden) Hampus Lindholm (D)
5	(Canada) Morgan Rielly (D)	(Czech Republic) Tomas Hertl (C)
6	(Canada) Cody Ceci (D)	(Sweden) Pontus Aberg (LW)
7	(Czech Republic) Radek Faksa (C)	(Finland) Ville Pokka (D)
8	(Finland) Olli Maatta (D)	(Sweden) Ludvig Bystrom (D)
9	(United States) Jacob Trouba (D)	(Russia) Nikolai Prokhorkin (LW)
10	(Canada) Griffin Reinhart (D)	(Russia) Anton Slepyshev (LW)

Ranking	North American goalies	European goalies
1	(Canada) Malcolm Subban	(Russia) Andrei Vasilevskiy
2	(Canada) Brandon Whitney	(Sweden) Oscar Dansk
3	(Canada) Jake Paterson	(Finland) Joonas Korpisalo

== Selections by round ==
= NHL All-Star team ·	= NHL All-Star (Note: Players are identified as an All-Star if they were selected for the All-Star game at any time in their career.) ·	= NHL All-Star and NHL All-Star team ·

=== Round one ===
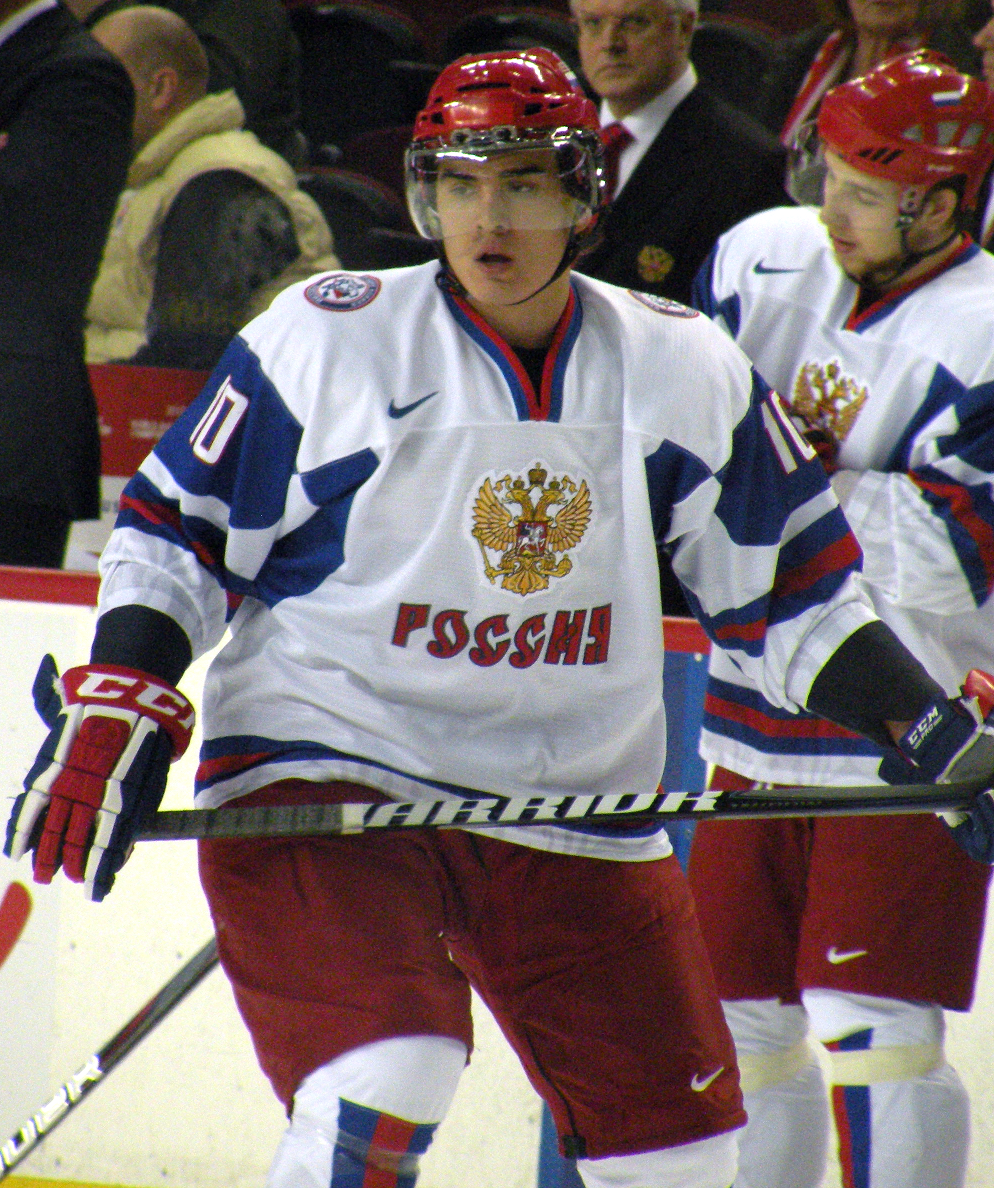
Nail Yakupov was selected first overall by the Edmonton Oilers.

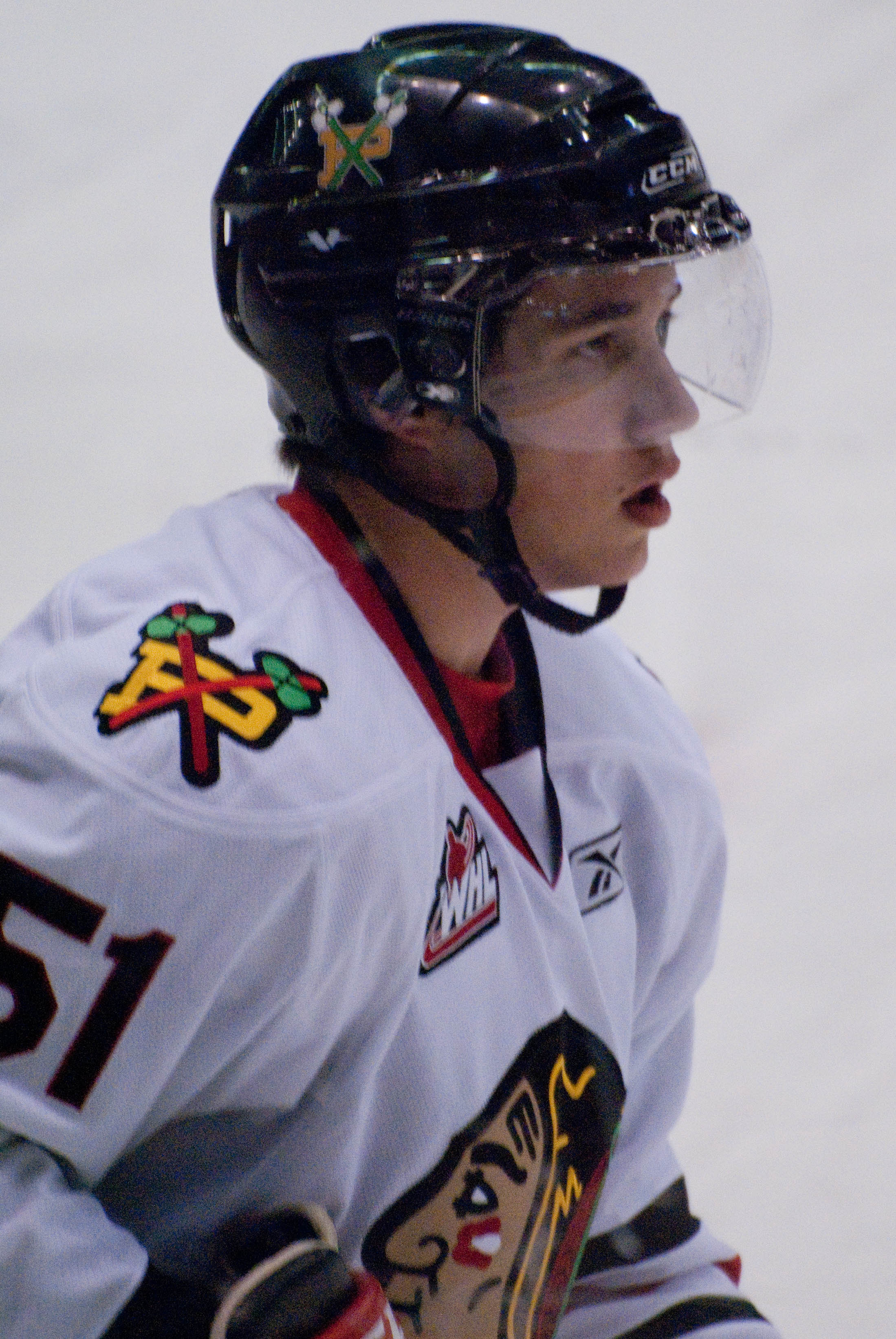
Derrick Pouliot was selected eight overall by the Pittsburgh Penguins.

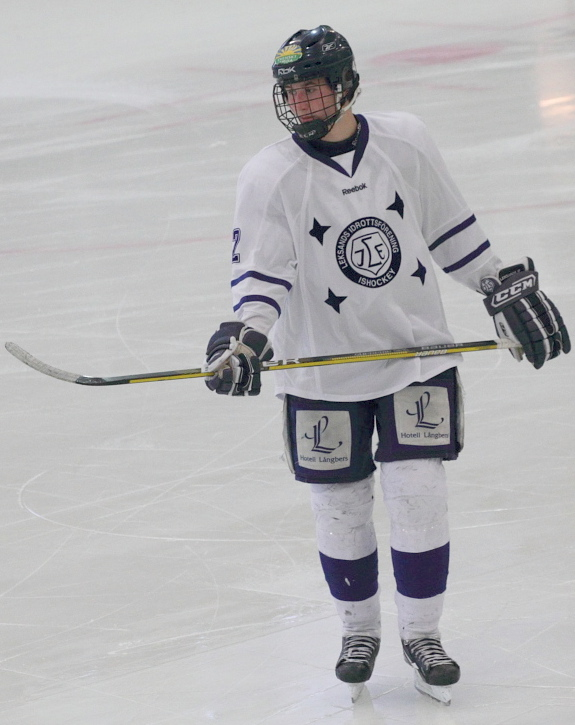
Filip Forsberg was selected 11th overall by the Washington Capitals.

#	Player	Nationality	NHL team	College/junior/club team
1	Nail Yakupov (RW)	Russia	Edmonton Oilers	Sarnia Sting (OHL)
2	Ryan Murray (D)	Canada	Columbus Blue Jackets	Everett Silvertips (WHL)
3	Alex Galchenyuk (C)	United States	Montreal Canadiens	Sarnia Sting (OHL)
4	Griffin Reinhart (D)	Canada	New York Islanders	Edmonton Oil Kings (WHL)
5	Morgan Rielly (D)	Canada	Toronto Maple Leafs	Moose Jaw Warriors (WHL)
6	Hampus Lindholm (D)	Sweden	Anaheim Ducks	Rogle BK (Allsvenskan)
7	Matt Dumba (D)	Canada	Minnesota Wild	Red Deer Rebels (WHL)
8	Derrick Pouliot (D)	Canada	Pittsburgh Penguins (from Carolina)^{1}	Portland Winterhawks (WHL)
9	Jacob Trouba (D)	United States	Winnipeg Jets	US NTDP (USHL)
10	Slater Koekkoek (D)	Canada	Tampa Bay Lightning	Peterborough Petes (OHL)
11	Filip Forsberg (RW)	Sweden	Washington Capitals (from Colorado)^{2}	Leksands IF (Allsvenskan)
12	Mikhail Grigorenko (C)	Russia	Buffalo Sabres	Quebec Remparts (QMJHL)
13	Radek Faksa (C)	Czech Republic	Dallas Stars	Kitchener Rangers (OHL)
14	Zemgus Girgensons (C)	Latvia	Buffalo Sabres (from Calgary)^{3}	Dubuque Fighting Saints (USHL)
15	Cody Ceci (D)	Canada	Ottawa Senators	Ottawa 67's (OHL)
16	Tom Wilson (RW)	Canada	Washington Capitals	Plymouth Whalers (OHL)
17	Tomas Hertl (C)	Czech Republic	San Jose Sharks	Slavia Prague (ELH)
18	Teuvo Teravainen (RW)	Finland	Chicago Blackhawks	Jokerit (SM-liiga)
19	Andrei Vasilevskiy (G)	Russia	Tampa Bay Lightning (from Detroit)^{4}	Tolpar Ufa (MHL)
20	Scott Laughton (C)	Canada	Philadelphia Flyers	Oshawa Generals (OHL)
21	Mark Jankowski (C)	Canada	Calgary Flames (from Nashville via Buffalo)^{5}	Stanstead College (HS–Quebec)
22	Olli Maatta (D)	Finland	Pittsburgh Penguins	London Knights (OHL)
23	Mike Matheson (D)	Canada	Florida Panthers	Dubuque Fighting Saints (USHL)
24	Malcolm Subban (G)	Canada	Boston Bruins	Belleville Bulls (OHL)
25	Jordan Schmaltz (D)	United States	St. Louis Blues	Green Bay Gamblers (USHL)
26	Brendan Gaunce (C)	Canada	Vancouver Canucks	Belleville Bulls (OHL)
27	Henrik Samuelsson (C)	United States	Phoenix Coyotes	Edmonton Oil Kings (WHL)
28	Brady Skjei (D)	United States	New York Rangers	US NTDP (USHL)
29	Stefan Matteau (C)	United States	New Jersey Devils	US NTDP (USHL)
30	Tanner Pearson (LW)	Canada	Los Angeles Kings	Barrie Colts (OHL)

Notes

1. The Carolina Hurricanes' first-round pick went to the Pittsburgh Penguins as the result of a trade on June 22, 2012, that sent Jordan Staal to Carolina in exchange for Brandon Sutter, Brian Dumoulin and this pick.
2. The Colorado Avalanche's first-round pick went to the Washington Capitals as the result of a trade on July 1, 2011, that sent Semyon Varlamov to Colorado in exchange for a second-round pick in either 2012 or 2013 and this pick.
3. The Calgary Flames' first-round pick went to the Buffalo Sabres as the result of a trade on June 22, 2012, that sent Nashville's first-round pick in 2012 (21st overall) and Buffalo's second-round pick in 2012 (42nd overall) to Calgary for this pick.
4. The Detroit Red Wings' first-round pick went to the Tampa Bay Lightning as the result of a trade on February 21, 2012, that sent Kyle Quincey to Detroit in exchange for Sebastien Piche and this pick.
5. The Nashville Predators' first-round pick went to the Calgary Flames as the result of a trade on June 22, 2012, that sent Calgary's first-round pick in 2012 (14th overall) to Buffalo in exchange for Buffalo's second-round pick in 2012 (42nd overall) and this pick.
  Buffalo previously acquired this pick as the result of a trade on February 27, 2012, that sent Paul Gaustad and Buffalo's fourth-round draft pick in 2013 to Nashville in exchange for this pick.

=== Round two ===
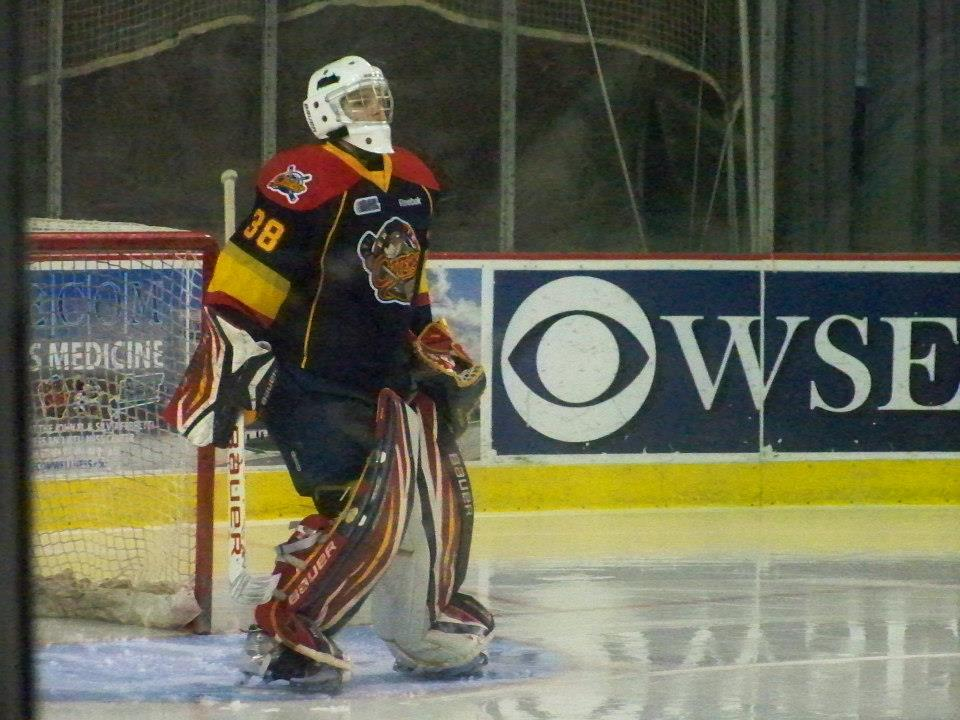
Oscar Dansk was selected 31st overall by the Columbus Blue Jackets.

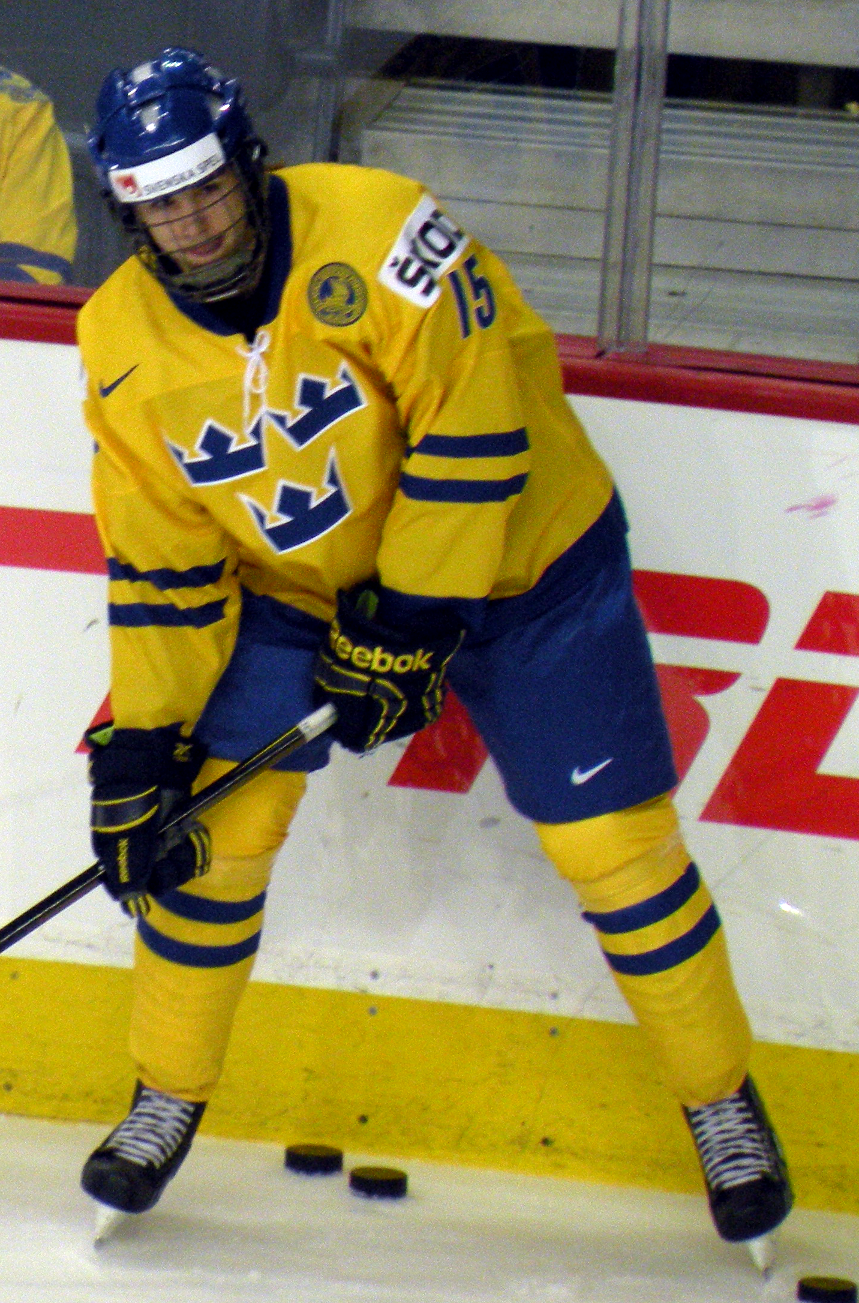
Sebastian Collberg was selected 33rd overall by the Montreal Canadiens.

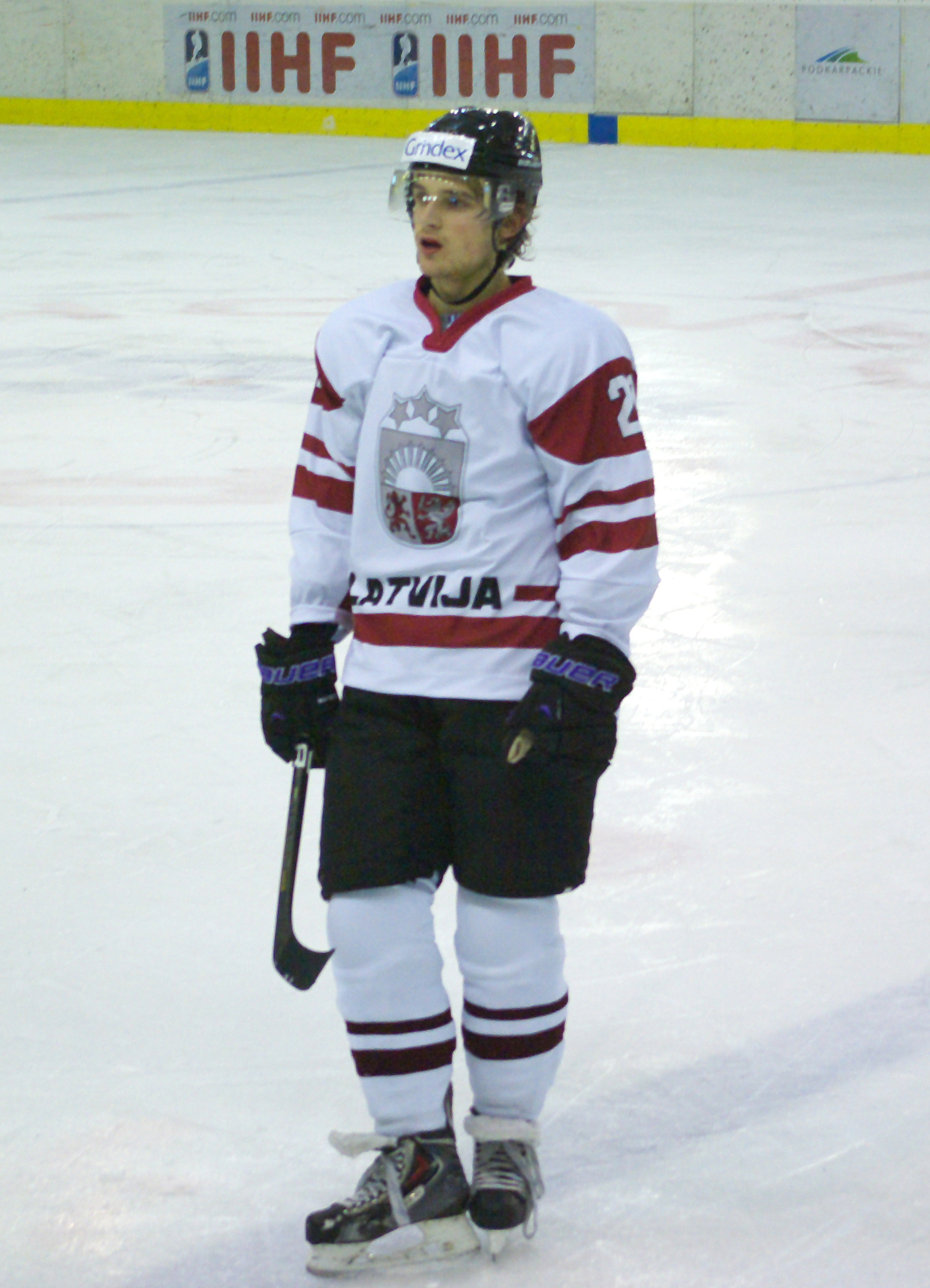
Teodors Blugers was selected 52nd overall by the Pittsburgh Penguins.

#	Player	Nationality	NHL team	College/junior/club team
31	Oscar Dansk (G)	Sweden	Columbus Blue Jackets	Brynas IF (Elitserien)
32	Mitchell Moroz (LW)	Canada	Edmonton Oilers	Edmonton Oil Kings (WHL)
33	Sebastian Collberg (RW)	Sweden	Montreal Canadiens	Frolunda HC (Elitserien)
34	Ville Pokka (D)	Finland	New York Islanders	Karpat (SM-liiga)
35	Matthew Finn (D)	Canada	Toronto Maple Leafs	Guelph Storm (OHL)
36	Nic Kerdiles (LW)	United States	Anaheim Ducks	US NTDP (USHL)
37	Pontus Aberg (LW)	Sweden	Nashville Predators (from Minnesota via San Jose and Tampa Bay)^{1}	Djurgardens IF J20 (J20 SuperElit)
38	Phillip Di Giuseppe (LW)	Canada	Carolina Hurricanes	University of Michigan (CCHA)
39	Lukas Sutter (C)	Canada	Winnipeg Jets	Saskatoon Blades (WHL)
40	Dylan Blujus (D)	United States	Tampa Bay Lightning	Brampton Battalion (OHL)
41	Mitchell Heard (C)	Canada	Colorado Avalanche	Plymouth Whalers (OHL)
42	Patrick Sieloff (D)	United States	Calgary Flames (from Buffalo)^{2}	US NTDP (USHL)
43	Ludvig Bystrom (D)	Sweden	Dallas Stars	MODO J20 (J20 SuperElit)
44	Jake McCabe (D)	United States	Buffalo Sabres (from Calgary)^{3}	University of Wisconsin (WCHA)
45	Anthony Stolarz (G)	United States	Philadelphia Flyers (from Ottawa via Phoenix and Columbus)^{4}	Corpus Christi IceRays (NAHL)
46	Raphael Bussieres (LW)	Canada	Minnesota Wild (from Washington via New Jersey)^{5}	Baie-Comeau Drakkar (QMJHL)
47	Brock McGinn (LW)	Canada	Carolina Hurricanes (from San Jose)^{6}	Guelph Storm (OHL)
48	Dillon Fournier (D)	Canada	Chicago Blackhawks	Rouyn-Noranda Huskies (QMJHL)
49	Martin Frk (RW)	Czech Republic	Detroit Red Wings	Halifax Mooseheads (QMJHL)
50	Colton Sissons (C)	Canada	Nashville Predators (from Philadelphia via Tampa Bay)^{7}	Kelowna Rockets (WHL)
51	Dalton Thrower (D)	Canada	Montreal Canadiens (from Nashville)^{8}	Saskatoon Blades (WHL)
52	Teodors Blugers (C)	Latvia	Pittsburgh Penguins	Shattuck-Saint Mary's (Midget AAA)
53	Brian Hart (RW)	United States	Tampa Bay Lightning (from Florida via Philadelphia)^{9}	Exeter (USHS–NH)
54	Mike Winther (C)	Canada	Dallas Stars (from Boston via Toronto, Colorado and Washington)^{10}	Prince Albert Raiders (WHL)
55	Chris Tierney (C)	Canada	San Jose Sharks (compensatory)^{11}	London Knights (OHL)
56	Samuel Kurker (RW)	United States	St. Louis Blues	St. John's Prep (USHS–MA)
57	Alexandre Mallet (LW)	Canada	Vancouver Canucks	Rimouski Oceanic (QMJHL)
58	Jordan Martinook (LW)	Canada	Phoenix Coyotes	Vancouver Giants (WHL)
59	Cristoval Nieves (C)	United States	New York Rangers	Kent School (USHS–CT)
60	Damon Severson (D)	Canada	New Jersey Devils	Kelowna Rockets (WHL)
61	Devin Shore (C)	Canada	Dallas Stars (from Los Angeles via Philadelphia)^{12}	Whitby Fury (OJHL)

Notes

1. The Minnesota Wild's second-round pick went to the Nashville Predators as the result of a trade on June 15, 2012, that sent Anders Lindback, Kyle Wilson and Nashville's seventh-round pick in 2012 to Tampa Bay in exchange for Sebastien Caron, Philadelphia's second-round pick in 2012, Tampa Bay's third-round pick in 2013 and this pick.
  Tampa Bay previously acquired this pick as the result of a trade on February 16, 2012, that sent Dominic Moore and a seventh-round pick in 2012 to San Jose in exchange for this pick.
  San Jose previously acquired this pick as the result of a trade on June 24, 2011, that sent Devin Setoguchi, Charlie Coyle and a first-round pick in 2011 to Minnesota in exchange for Brent Burns and this pick.
2. The Buffalo Sabres' second-round pick went to the Calgary Flames as the result of a trade on June 22, 2012, that sent Calgary's first-round pick in 2012 (14th overall) to Buffalo in exchange for Nashville's first-round pick in 2012 (21st overall) and this pick.
3. The Calgary Flames' second-round pick went to the Buffalo Sabres as the result of a trade on June 25, 2011, that sent Chris Butler and Paul Byron to Calgary in exchange for Robyn Regehr, Ales Kotalik and this pick.
4. The Ottawa Senators' second-round pick went to the Philadelphia Flyers as a result of a trade on June 22, 2012, that sent Sergei Bobrovsky to Columbus in exchange for Vancouver's fourth-round pick in 2012, Phoenix's fourth round pick in 2013, and this pick.
  Columbus previously acquired this pick as a result of a trade on February 22, 2012, that sent Antoine Vermette to Phoenix in exchange for Curtis McElhinney, a conditional fourth-round pick in 2013 and this pick.
  Phoenix previously acquired this pick as a result of a trade on December 17, 2011, that sent Kyle Turris to Ottawa in exchange for David Rundblad and this pick.
5. The Washington Capitals' second-round pick went to the Minnesota Wild as the result of a trade on February 24, 2012, that sent Marek Zidlicky to New Jersey in exchange for Kurtis Foster, Nick Palmieri, Stephane Veilleux, a conditional third-round pick in 2013 and this pick.
  New Jersey previously acquired this pick as the result of a trade on February 28, 2011, that sent Jason Arnott to Washington in exchange for Dave Steckel and this pick.
6. The San Jose Sharks' second-round pick went to the Carolina Hurricanes as the result of a trade on February 18, 2011, that sent Ian White to San Jose in exchange for this pick.
7. The Philadelphia Flyers' second-round pick went to the Nashville Predators as the result of a trade that sent Anders Lindback, Kyle Wilson and Nashville's seventh-round pick in 2012 to Tampa Bay in exchange for Sebastien Caron, Minnesota's second-round pick in 2012, Tampa Bay's third-round pick in 2013 and this pick.
  Tampa Bay previously acquired this pick as the result of a trade on July 1, 2010, that sent Andrej Meszaros to Philadelphia in exchange for this pick.
8. The Nashville Predators' second-round pick went to the Montreal Canadiens as the result of a trade on February 17, 2012, that sent Hal Gill and a conditional fifth-round pick in 2013 to Nashville in exchange for Blake Geoffrion, Robert Slaney and this pick.
9. The Florida Panthers' second-round pick went to the Tampa Bay Lightning as the result of a trade on February 18, 2012, that sent Pavel Kubina to Philadelphia in exchange for Philadelphia's fourth-round pick in 2013, Jon Kalinski and this pick (being conditional at the time of the trade). The condition – Florida will trade a second-round pick in 2012 or 2013 at their choice – was converted on June 23, 2012.
  Philadelphia previously acquired this pick as the result of a trade on July 1, 2011, that sent Kris Versteeg to Florida in exchange for San Jose's third-round pick in 2012 and this conditional pick.
10. The Boston Bruins' second-round pick went to the Dallas Stars as the result of a trade on June 22, 2012, that sent Mike Ribeiro to Washington in exchange for Cody Eakin and this pick.
  Washington previously acquired this pick as the result of a trade on July 1, 2012, that sent Semyon Varlamov to Colorado in exchange for Colorado's first round pick, as well as this pick. Washington opted to take this pick on June 15, 2012.
  Colorado previously acquired this pick as the result of a trade on June 24, 2011, that sent John-Michael Liles to Toronto in exchange for this pick.
  Toronto previously acquired the pick as the result of a trade that sent Tomas Kaberle to the Bruins in exchange for Joe Colborne, a first-round pick in 2011, and this pick (being conditional at the time of the trade). The condition – Boston reaching the 2011 Stanley Cup Finals – was converted on May 27, 2011.
11. The San Jose Sharks received the 25th pick of this round (55th overall) as compensation for not signing 2007 first-round draft pick Patrick White.
12. The Los Angeles Kings' second-round pick went to the Dallas Stars as the result of a trade on February 16, 2012, that sent Nicklas Grossmann to Philadelphia in exchange for Minnesota's third-round pick in 2013 and this pick.
  Philadelphia previously acquired this pick as the result of a trade on June 23, 2011, that sent Mike Richards to Los Angeles in exchange for Wayne Simmonds, Brayden Schenn and this pick.

=== Round three ===
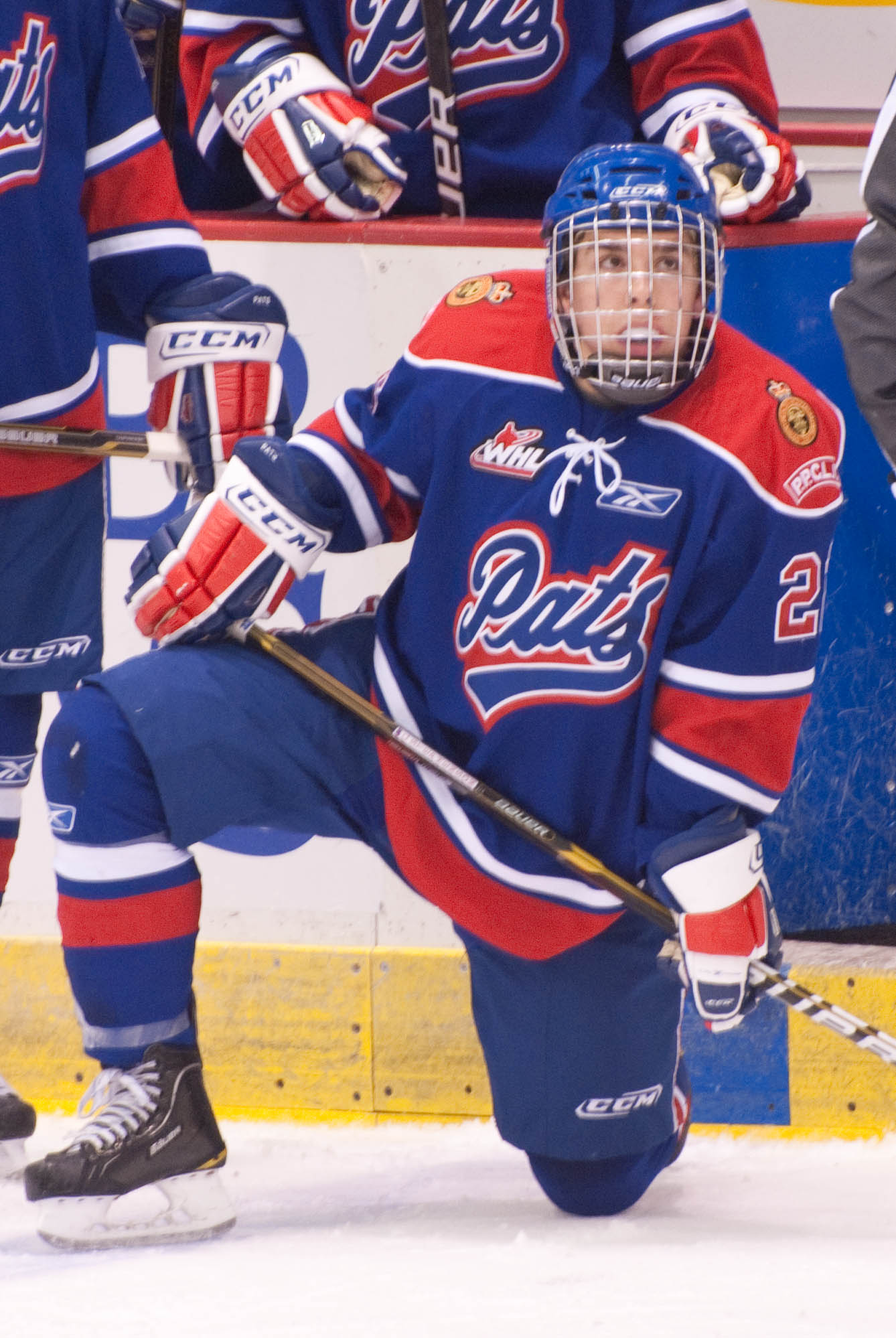
Chandler Stephenson was selected 77th overall by the Washington Capitals.

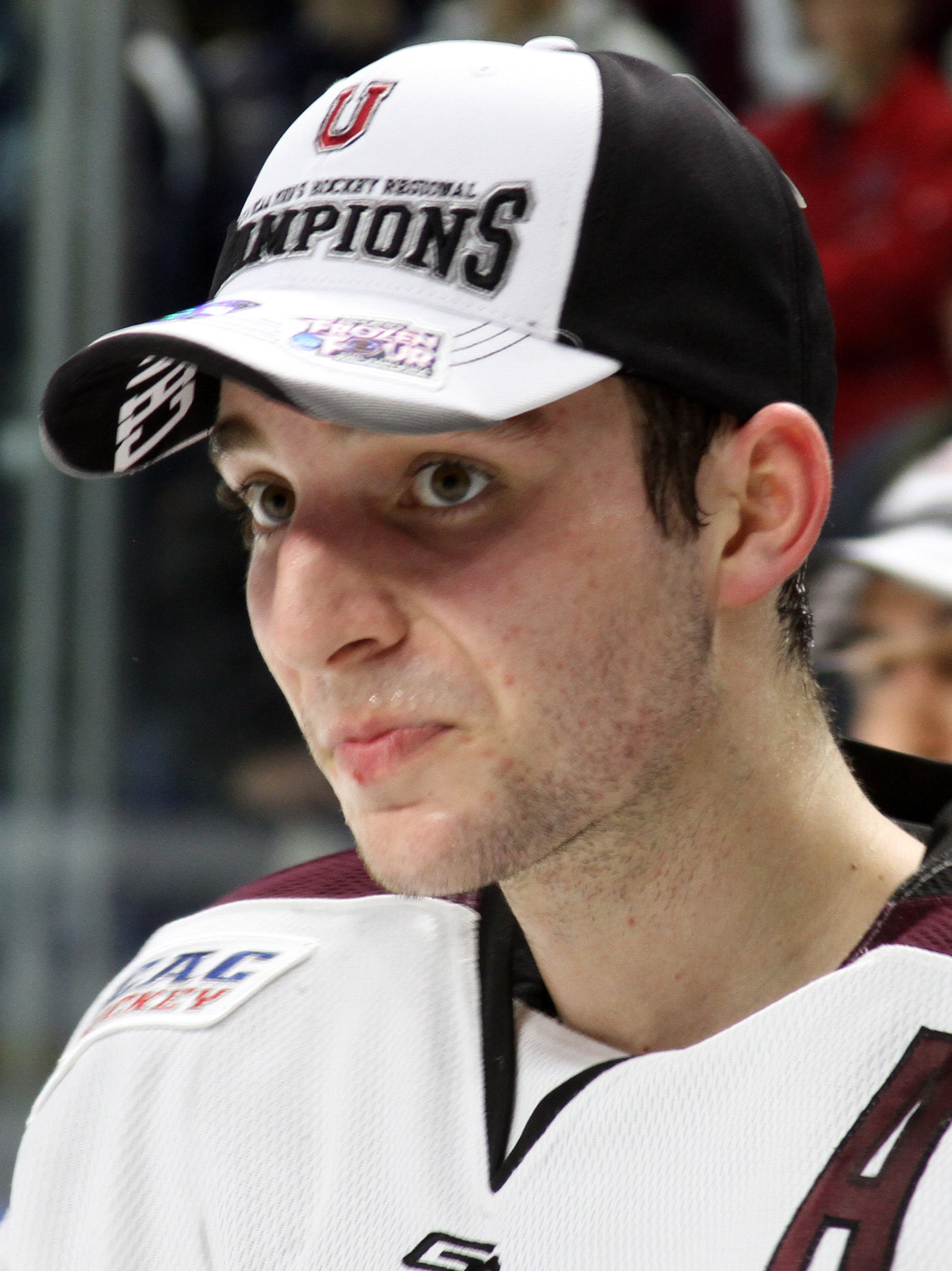
Shayne Gostisbehere was selected 78rd overall by the Philadelphia Flyers.

#	Player	Nationality	NHL team	College/junior/club team
62	Joonas Korpisalo (G)	Finland	Columbus Blue Jackets	Jokerit U20 (Jr. A SM-liiga)
63	Jujhar Khaira (LW)	Canada	Edmonton Oilers	Prince George Spruce Kings (BCHL)
64	Tim Bozon (LW)	France	Montreal Canadiens	Kamloops Blazers (WHL)
65	Adam Pelech (D)	Canada	New York Islanders	Erie Otters (OHL)
66	Jimmy Vesey (LW)	United States	Nashville Predators (from Toronto via Los Angeles)^{1}	South Shore Kings (EJHL)
67	Mackenzie MacEachern (LW)	United States	St. Louis Blues (from Anaheim)^{2}	Brother Rice High School (USHS–MI)
68	John Draeger (D)	United States	Minnesota Wild	Shattuck-St. Mary's (Midget AAA)
69	Daniel Altshuller (G)	Canada	Carolina Hurricanes	Oshawa Generals (OHL)
70	Scott Kosmachuk (RW)	Canada	Winnipeg Jets	Guelph Storm (OHL)
71	Tanner Richard (C)	Switzerland	Tampa Bay Lightning	Guelph Storm (OHL)
72	Troy Bourke (LW)	Canada	Colorado Avalanche	Prince George Cougars (WHL)
73	Justin Kea (C)	Canada	Buffalo Sabres	Saginaw Spirit (OHL)
74	Esa Lindell (D)	Finland	Dallas Stars	Jokerit U20 (Jr. A SM-liiga)
75	Jon Gillies (G)	United States	Calgary Flames	Indiana Ice (USHL)
76	Chris Driedger (G)	Canada	Ottawa Senators	Calgary Hitmen (WHL)
77	Chandler Stephenson (C/LW)	Canada	Washington Capitals	Regina Pats (WHL)
78	Shayne Gostisbehere (D)	United States	Philadelphia Flyers (from San Jose via Florida)^{3}	Union College (ECAC)
79	Chris Calnan (RW)	United States	Chicago Blackhawks	Noble and Greenough School (USHS–MA)
80	Jake Paterson (G)	Canada	Detroit Red Wings	Saginaw Spirit (OHL)
81	Oskar Sundqvist (C)	Sweden	Pittsburgh Penguins (from Philadelphia via Phoenix)^{4}	Skelleftea AIK J20 (J20 SuperElit)
82	Jarrod Maidens (C/LW)	Canada	Ottawa Senators (from Nashville)^{5}	Owen Sound Attack (OHL)
83	Matt Murray (G)	Canada	Pittsburgh Penguins	Sault Ste. Marie Greyhounds (OHL)
84	Steven Hodges (C)	Canada	Florida Panthers	Victoria Royals (WHL)
85	Matt Grzelcyk (D)	United States	Boston Bruins	US NTDP (USHL)
86	Colton Parayko (D)	Canada	St. Louis Blues	Fort McMurray Oil Barons (AJHL)
87	Frederik Andersen (G)	Denmark	Anaheim Ducks (from Vancouver)^{6}	Frolunda HC (Elitserien)
88	James Melindy (D)	Canada	Phoenix Coyotes	Moncton Wildcats (QMJHL)
89	Brendan Leipsic (LW)	Canada	Nashville Predators (from NY Rangers)^{7}	Portland Winterhawks (WHL)
90	Ben Johnson (C/LW)	United States	New Jersey Devils	Windsor Spitfires (OHL)
91	Daniil Zharkov (LW)	Russia	Edmonton Oilers (from Los Angeles)^{8}	Belleville Bulls (OHL)

Notes

1. The Toronto Maple Leafs' third-round pick went to the Nashville Predators as the result of a trade on June 25, 2011, that sent Nashville's third-round pick in 2011 to Los Angeles in exchange for Los Angeles' sixth-round pick in 2011 and this pick.
  Los Angeles previously acquired the pick as the result of a trade on June 26, 2010, that sent Los Angeles' third-round pick in 2010 to Toronto in exchange for this pick.
2. The Anaheim Ducks' third-round pick went to the St. Louis Blues as the result of a trade on February 28, 2011, that sent Brad Winchester to Anaheim in exchange for this pick.
3. The San Jose Sharks' third-round pick went to the Philadelphia Flyers as the result of a trade on July 1, 2011, that sent Kris Versteeg to Florida in exchange for a conditional second-round pick in either 2012 or 2013 and this pick.
  Florida previously acquired this pick as the result of a trade on June 25, 2011, that sent a second-round pick in 2011 to San Jose in exchange for a second-round pick in 2011 and this pick.
4. The Philadelphia Flyers' third-round pick went to Pittsburgh Penguins as the result of a trade on June 22, 2012, that sent Zbynek Michalek to Phoenix in exchange for Harrison Ruopp, Marc Cheverie and this pick.
  Phoenix had previously acquired this pick as the result of a trade on June 7, 2011, that sent Ilya Bryzgalov to Philadelphia in exchange for Matt Clackson, a conditional third-round pick in 2011 and future considerations (which became this pick).
5. The Nashville Predators' third-round pick went to the Ottawa Senators as the result of a trade on February 10, 2011, that sent Mike Fisher to Nashville in exchange for a first-round pick in 2011 and this pick (being conditional at the time of the trade). The condition – Nashville wins one round of the 2011 Stanley Cup playoffs – was converted on April 24, 2011.
6. The Vancouver Canucks' third-round pick went to the Anaheim Ducks as the result of a trade on February 28, 2011, that sent Maxim Lapierre and MacGregor Sharp to Vancouver in exchange for Joel Perrault and this pick.
7. The New York Rangers' third-round pick went to the Nashville Predators as the result of a trade on June 23, 2012, that sent Nashville's third-round pick in 2013 to the New York Rangers for this pick.
8. The Los Angeles Kings' third-round pick went to the Edmonton Oilers as the result of a trade on February 28, 2011, that sent Dustin Penner to Los Angeles in exchange for Colten Teubert, a first-round pick in 2011 and this pick (being conditional at the time of the trade). The condition – Los Angeles will not win the 2011 Stanley Cup – was converted on April 25, 2011.

=== Round four ===
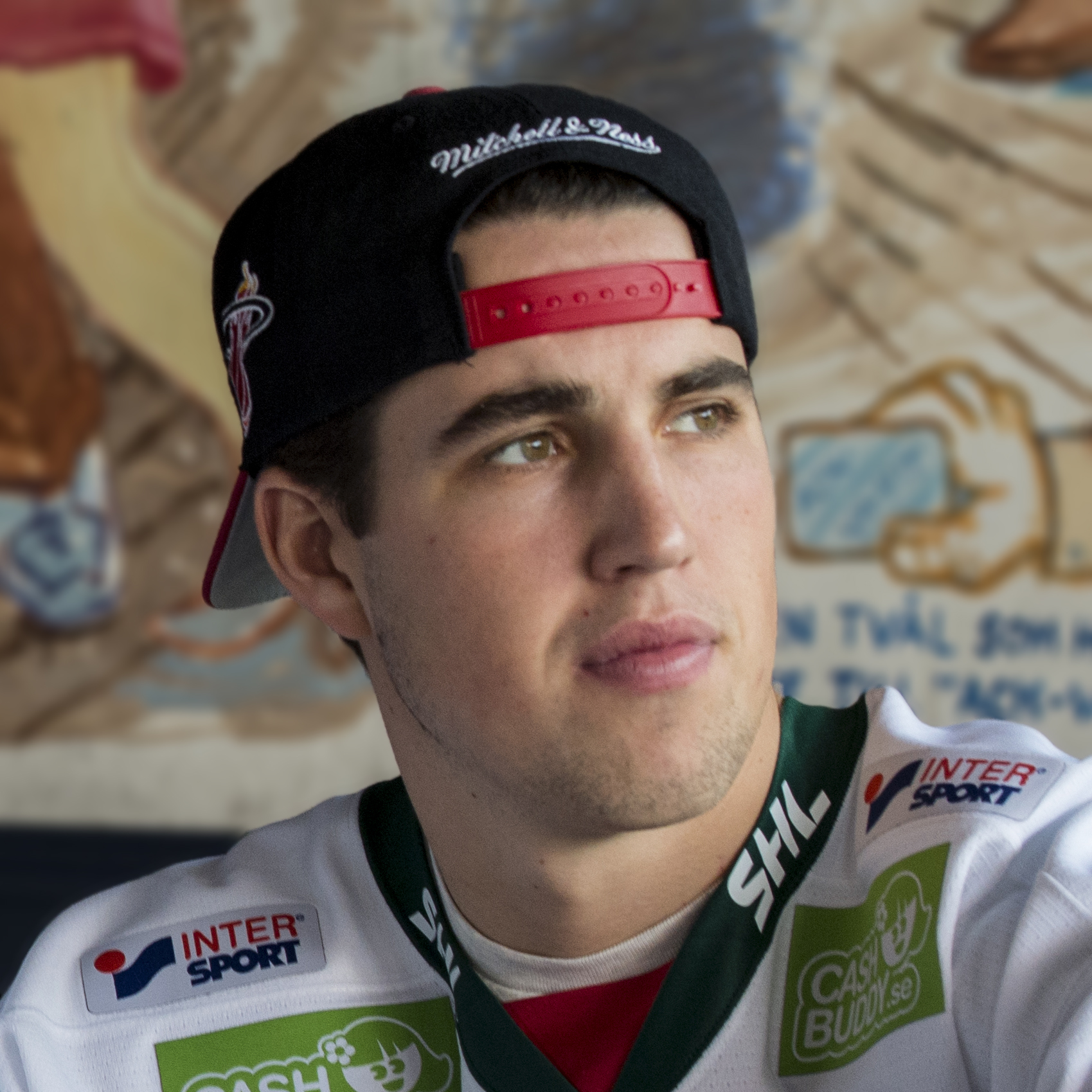
Erik Gustafsson was selected 93rd overall by the Edmonton Oilers.

#	Player	Nationality	NHL team	College/junior/club team
92	Matia Marcantuoni (C/RW)	Canada	Pittsburgh Penguins (from Columbus)^{1}	Kitchener Rangers (OHL)
93	Erik Gustafsson (D)	Sweden	Edmonton Oilers	Djurgardens IF J20 (J20 SuperElit)
94	Brady Vail (C)	United States	Montreal Canadiens	Windsor Spitfires (OHL)
95	Josh Anderson (RW)	Canada	Columbus Blue Jackets (from NY Islanders via Vancouver)^{2}	London Knights (OHL)
96	Ben Thomson (LW)	Canada	New Jersey Devils (from Toronto)^{3}	Kitchener Rangers (OHL)
97	Kevin Roy (C)	Canada	Anaheim Ducks	Lincoln Stars (USHL)
98	Adam Gilmour (C)	United States	Minnesota Wild	Noble and Greenough School (USHS–MA)
99	Erik Karlsson (C/LW)	Sweden	Carolina Hurricanes	Frolunda HC J20 (J20 SuperElit)
100	Thomas DiPauli (C)	United States	Washington Capitals (from Winnipeg)^{4}	US NTDP (USHL)
101	Cedric Paquette (C)	Canada	Tampa Bay Lightning	Blainville-Boisbriand Armada (QMJHL)
102	Rhett Holland (D)	Canada	Phoenix Coyotes (from Colorado)^{5}	Okotoks Oilers (AJHL)
103	Loic Leduc (D)	Canada	New York Islanders (from Buffalo)^{6}	Cape Breton Screaming Eagles (QMJHL)
104	Gemel Smith (C)	Canada	Dallas Stars	Owen Sound Attack (OHL)
105	Brett Kulak (D)	Canada	Calgary Flames	Vancouver Giants (WHL)
106	Tim Boyle (D)	United States	Ottawa Senators	Noble and Greenough School (USHS–MA)
107	Austin Wuthrich (RW)	United States	Washington Capitals	University of Notre Dame (CCHA)
108	Andrew O'Brien (D)	Canada	Anaheim Ducks (from San Jose)^{7}	Chicoutimi Sagueneens (QMJHL)
109	Christopher Lalancette (RW)	Canada	San Jose Sharks (from Chicago)^{8}	Acadie-Bathurst Titan (QMJHL)
110	Andreas Athanasiou (C/LW)	Canada	Detroit Red Wings	London Knights (OHL)
111	Fredric Larsson (D)	Sweden	Philadelphia Flyers	Brynas IF J20 (J20 SuperElit)
112	Zach Stepan (C)	United States	Nashville Predators	Shattuck-St. Mary's (Midget AAA)
113	Sean Maguire (G)	Canada	Pittsburgh Penguins	Powell River Kings (BCHL)
114	Alexander Delnov (LW)	Russia	Florida Panthers	Mytishchi Khimik (MHL)
115	Trevor Carrick (D)	Canada	Carolina Hurricanes (from Boston)^{9}	Mississauga St. Michael's Majors (OHL)
116	Nick Walters (D)	Canada	St. Louis Blues	Everett Silvertips (WHL)
117	Taylor Leier (LW)	Canada	Philadelphia Flyers (from Vancouver via Columbus)^{10}	Portland Winterhawks (WHL)
118	Mikko Vainonen (D)	Finland	Nashville Predators (from Phoenix)^{11}	HIFK U20 (Jr. A SM-liiga)
119	Calle Andersson (D)	Sweden	New York Rangers	Farjestad BK J20 (J20 SuperElit)
120	Jaccob Slavin (D)	United States	Carolina Hurricanes (from New Jersey)^{12}	Chicago Steel (USHL)
121	Nikolai Prokhorkin (LW)	Russia	Los Angeles Kings	CSKA Moscow (MHL)

Notes

1. The Columbus Blue Jackets' fourth-round pick went to the Pittsburgh Penguins as the result of a trade on November 8, 2011, that sent Mark Letestu to Columbus in exchange for this pick.
2. The New York Islanders' fourth-round pick went to the Columbus Blue Jackets as the result of a trade on February 27, 2012, that sent Samuel Pahlsson to Vancouver in exchange for Vancouver's fourth-round pick in 2012 and this pick.
  Vancouver previously acquired this pick as the result of a trade on June 28, 2011, that sent Christian Ehrhoff to New York in exchange for this pick.
3. The Toronto Maple Leafs' fourth-round pick went to the New Jersey Devils as the result of a trade on October 4, 2011, that sent Dave Steckel to Toronto in exchange for this pick.
4. The Winnipeg Jets' fourth-round pick went to the Washington Capitals as the result of a trade on July 8, 2011, that sent Eric Fehr to Winnipeg in exchange for Danick Paquette and this pick.
5. The Colorado Avalanche's fourth-round pick went to the Phoenix Coyotes as the result of a trade on June 28, 2010, that sent Daniel Winnik to Colorado in exchange for this pick.
6. The Buffalo Sabres' fourth-round pick went to the New York Islanders as the result of a trade on June 29, 2011, that sent Christian Ehrhoff to Buffalo in exchange for this pick.
7. The San Jose Sharks' fourth-round pick went to the Anaheim Ducks as the result of a trade on March 4, 2009, that sent Travis Moen and Kent Huskins to San Jose in exchange for Nick Bonino, Timo Pielmeier, a conditional pick in either 2009 or 2011 and this pick (being conditional at the time of the trade). The condition – San Jose re-signs at least one of Moen or Huskins while Anaheim signs neither of the two players – was converted on July 9 and 10, 2009.
8. The Chicago Blackhawks' fourth-round pick went to the San Jose Sharks as the result of a trade on June 23, 2012, that sent Tampa Bay's seventh-round pick in 2012 (191st overall) and San Jose's fourth-round pick in 2013 to Chicago in exchange for this pick.
9. The Boston Bruins' fourth-round pick went to the Carolina Hurricanes as the result of a trade on July 5, 2011, that sent Joe Corvo to Boston in exchange for this pick.
10. The Vancouver Canucks' fourth-round pick went to the Philadelphia Flyers as a result of a trade on June 22, 2012, that sent Sergei Bobrovsky to Columbus in exchange for Ottawa's second-round pick in 2012, Phoenix's fourth-round pick in 2013, and this pick.
  Columbus previously acquired this pick as a result of a trade on February 27, 2012, that sent Samuel Pahlsson to Vancouver in exchange for the NY Islanders' fourth-round pick in 2012 and this pick.
11. The Phoenix Coyotes' fourth-round pick went to the Nashville Predators as the result of a trade on October 28, 2011, that sent Cal O'Reilly to Phoenix in exchange for this pick.
12. The New Jersey Devils' fourth-round pick went to the Carolina Hurricanes as the result of a trade on January 20, 2012, that sent Alexei Ponikarovsky to New Jersey in exchange for Joe Sova and this pick.

=== Round five ===
#	Player	Nationality	NHL team	College/junior/club team
122	Charles Hudon (LW)	Canada	Montreal Canadiens (from Columbus)^{1}	Chicoutimi Sagueneens (QMJHL)
123	Joey LaLeggia (D)	Canada	Edmonton Oilers	University of Denver (WCHA)
124	Ryan Culkin (D)	Canada	Calgary Flames (from Montreal)^{2}	Quebec Remparts (QMJHL)
125	Doyle Somerby (D)	United States	New York Islanders	Kimball Union Academy (USHS–NH)
126	Dominic Toninato (C)	United States	Toronto Maple Leafs	Duluth East High School (USHS–MN)
127	Brian Cooper (D)	United States	Anaheim Ducks (from Anaheim via Montreal)^{3}	Fargo Force (USHL)
128	Daniel Gunnarsson (D)	Sweden	Minnesota Wild	Lulea HF (Elitserien)
129	Brendan Woods (LW)	Canada	Carolina Hurricanes	University of Wisconsin (WCHA)
130	Connor Hellebuyck (G)	United States	Winnipeg Jets	Odessa Jackalopes (NAHL)
131	Seth Griffith (C)	Canada	Boston Bruins (from Tampa Bay)^{4}	London Knights (OHL)
132	Michael Clarke (C)	Canada	Colorado Avalanche	Windsor Spitfires (OHL)
133	Logan Nelson (C)	United States	Buffalo Sabres	Victoria Royals (WHL)
134	Branden Troock (RW)	Canada	Dallas Stars	Seattle Thunderbirds (WHL)
135	Graham Black (C)	Canada	New Jersey Devils (from Calgary)^{5}	Swift Current Broncos (WHL)
136	Robert Baillargeon (C)	United States	Ottawa Senators	Indiana Ice (USHL)
137	Connor Carrick (D)	United States	Washington Capitals	US NTDP (USHL)
138	Danny O'Regan (C)	United States	San Jose Sharks	Saint Sebastian's School (USHS–MA)
139	Garret Ross (LW)	United States	Chicago Blackhawks	Saginaw Spirit (OHL)
140	Michael McKee (D)	Canada	Detroit Red Wings	Lincoln Stars (USHL)
141	Reece Willcox (D)	Canada	Philadelphia Flyers	Merritt Centennials (BCHL)
142	Thomas Spelling (D)	Denmark	New York Rangers (from Nashville)^{6}	Herning Blue Fox (Superisligaen)
143	Clark Seymour (D)	Canada	Pittsburgh Penguins	Peterborough Petes (OHL)
144	Henri Kiviaho (G)	Finland	Dallas Stars (from Florida)^{7}	KalPa U20 (Jr. A SM-liiga)
145	Cody Payne (RW)	Canada	Boston Bruins	Plymouth Whalers (OHL)
146	Francois Tremblay (G)	Canada	St. Louis Blues	Val-d'Or Foreurs (QMJHL)
147	Ben Hutton (D)	Canada	Vancouver Canucks	Nepean Raiders (CCHL)
148	Niklas Tikkinen (D)	Finland	Phoenix Coyotes	Blues U20 (Jr. A SM-liiga)
149	Travis Brown (D)	Canada	Chicago Blackhawks (from NY Rangers)^{8}	Moose Jaw Warriors (WHL)
150	Alexander Kerfoot (C)	Canada	New Jersey Devils	Coquitlam Express (BCHL)
151	Colin Miller (D)	Canada	Los Angeles Kings	Sault Ste. Marie Greyhounds (OHL)

Notes

1. The Columbus Blue Jackets' fifth-round pick went to the Montreal Canadiens as the result of a trade on June 29, 2011, that sent James Wisniewski to Columbus in exchange for this pick (being conditional at the time of the trade). The condition – Wisniewski is signed by Columbus for the 2011–12 NHL season – was converted on July 1, 2011.
2. The Montreal Canadiens' fifth-round pick went to the Calgary Flames as the result of a trade on January 12, 2012, that sent Rene Bourque, Patrick Holland and Calgary's second-round pick in 2013 to Montreal in exchange for Michael Cammalleri, Karri Ramo and this pick.
3. The Anaheim Ducks' fifth-round pick was re-acquired from the Montreal Canadiens as the result of a trade on February 16, 2011, that sent Paul Mara to Montreal in exchange for this pick.
  Montreal previously acquired the pick as the result of a trade on December 31, 2010, that sent Maxim Lapierre to Anaheim in exchange for Brett Festerling and this pick.
4. The Tampa Bay Lightning's fifth-round pick will go to the Boston Bruins as the result of a trade on June 23, 2012, that sent Benoit Pouliot to Tampa Bay in exchange for Michel Ouellet and this pick.
5. The Calgary Flames' fifth-round pick went to the New Jersey Devils as the result of a trade on July 14, 2011, that sent Pierre-Luc Letourneau-Leblond to Calgary in exchange for this pick.
6. The Nashville Predators' fifth-round pick went to the New York Rangers as the result of a trade on June 23, 2012, that sent New York's fifth-round pick in 2013 to Nashville in exchange for this pick.
7. The Florida Panthers' fifth-round pick went to the Dallas Stars as the result of a trade on December 7, 2011, that sent Krys Barch and a sixth-round pick to Florida in exchange for Jake Hauswirth and this pick.
8. The New York Rangers' fifth-round pick went to the Chicago Blackhawks as the result of a trade on February 27, 2012, that sent John Scott to New York in exchange for this pick.

=== Round six ===
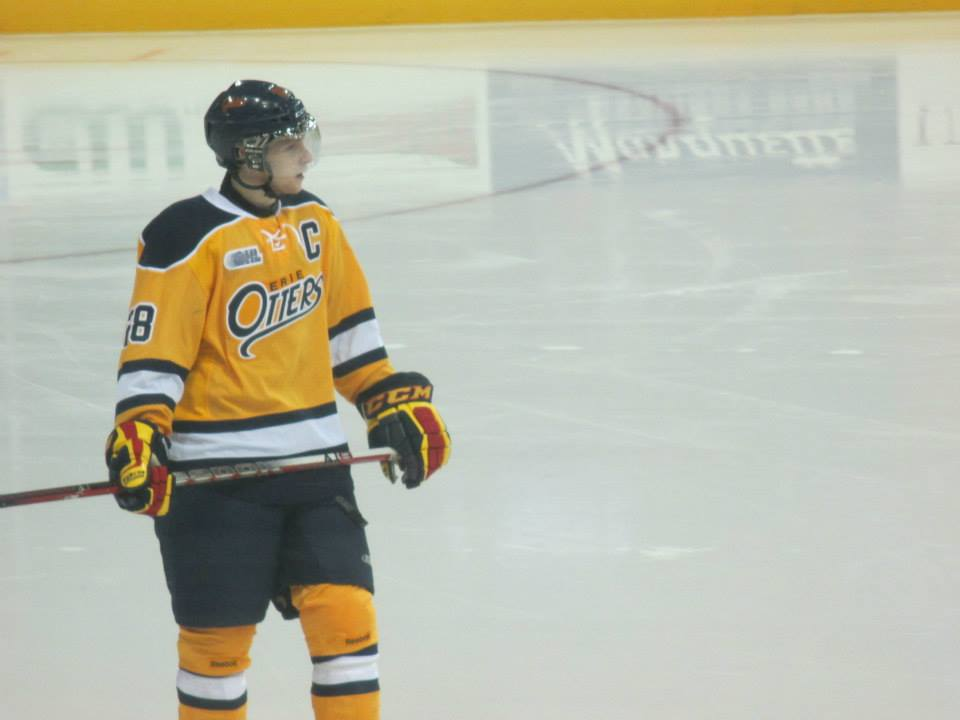
Connor Brown was selected 156th overall by the Toronto Maple Leafs.

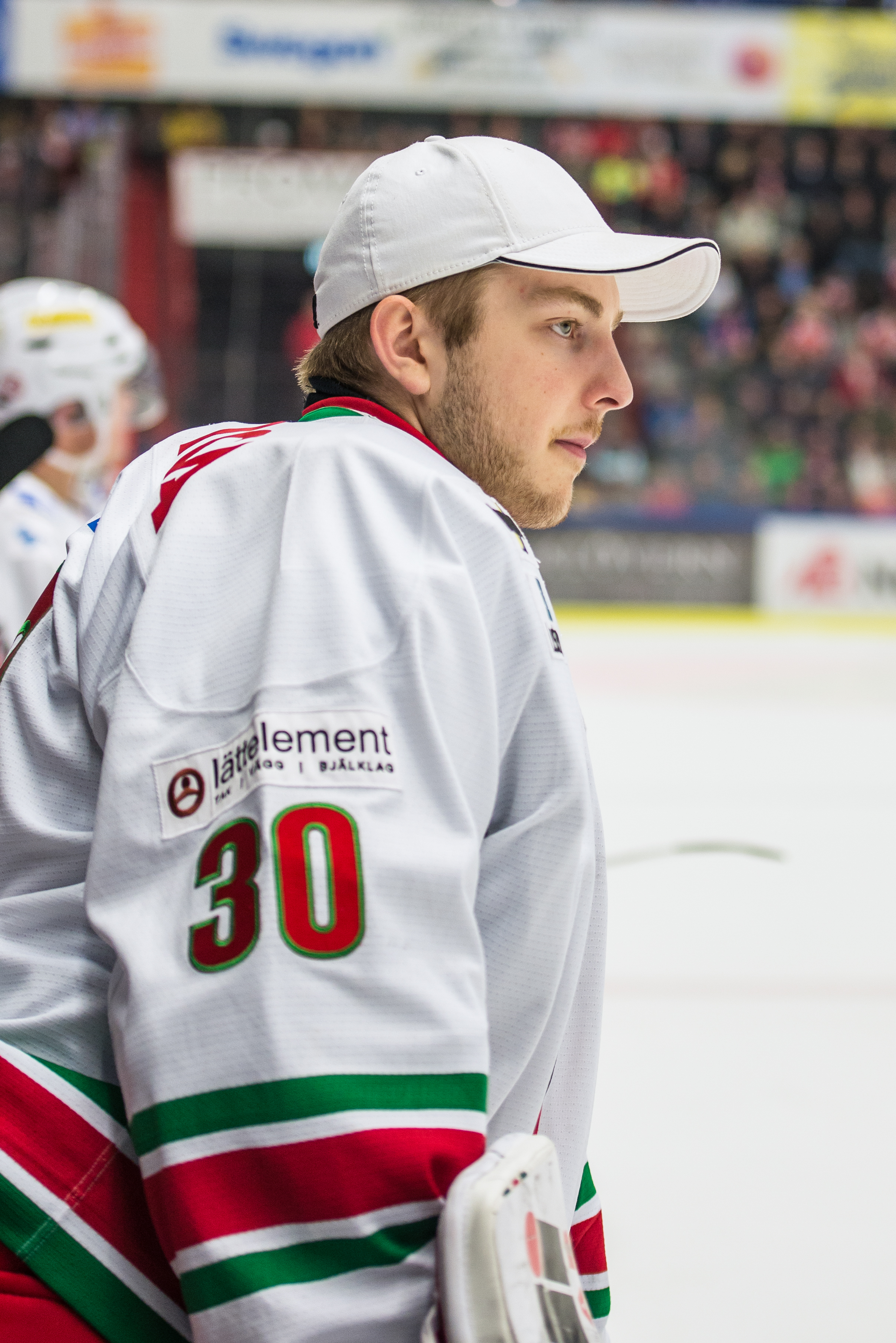
Linus Ullmark was selected 163rd overall by the Buffalo Sabres.

#	Player	Nationality	NHL team	College/junior/club team
152	Daniel Zaar (RW)	Sweden	Columbus Blue Jackets	Rogle BK J20 (J20 SuperElit)
153	John McCarron (RW)	United States	Edmonton Oilers	Cornell University (ECAC)
154	Erik Nystrom (LW)	Sweden	Montreal Canadiens	MODO J20 (J20 SuperElit)
155	Jesse Graham (D)	Canada	New York Islanders	Niagara IceDogs (OHL)
156	Connor Brown (RW)	Canada	Toronto Maple Leafs	Erie Otters (OHL)
157	Ryan Rupert (C)	Canada	Toronto Maple Leafs (from Anaheim)^{1}	London Knights (OHL)
158	Christoph Bertschy (C)	Switzerland	Minnesota Wild	SC Bern (NLA)
159	Colin Olsen (G)	United States	Carolina Hurricanes	US NTDP (USHL)
160	Ryan Olsen (C)	Canada	Winnipeg Jets	Saskatoon Blades (WHL)
161	Jake Dotchin (D)	Canada	Tampa Bay Lightning	Owen Sound Attack (OHL)
162	Joseph Blandisi (C/RW)	Canada	Colorado Avalanche	Owen Sound Attack (OHL)
163	Linus Ullmark (G)	Sweden	Buffalo Sabres	MODO J20 (J20 SuperElit)
164	Simon Fernholm (D)	Sweden	Nashville Predators (from Dallas via Florida)^{2}	Huddinge IK J20 (J20 SuperElit)
165	Coda Gordon (LW)	Canada	Calgary Flames	Swift Current Broncos (WHL)
166	Francois Brassard (G)	Canada	Ottawa Senators	Quebec Remparts (QMJHL)
167	Riley Barber (RW)	United States	Washington Capitals	US NTDP (USHL)
168	Clifford Watson (D)	United States	San Jose Sharks	Sioux City Musketeers (USHL)
169	Vince Hinostroza (C)	United States	Chicago Blackhawks	Waterloo Black Hawks (USHL)
170	James de Haas (D)	Canada	Detroit Red Wings	Toronto Lakeshore Patriots (OJHL)
171	Tomas Hyka (RW)	Czech Republic	Los Angeles Kings (from Philadelphia)^{3}	Gatineau Olympiques (QMJHL)
172	Max Gortz (RW)	Sweden	Nashville Predators	Farjestad BK J20 (J20 SuperElit)
173	Anton Zlobin (RW)	Russia	Pittsburgh Penguins	Shawinigan Cataractes (QMJHL)
174	Francis Beauvillier (C/LW)	Canada	Florida Panthers	Rimouski Oceanic (QMJHL)
175	Matthew Benning (D)	Canada	Boston Bruins	Spruce Grove Saints (AJHL)
176	Petteri Lindbohm (D)	Finland	St. Louis Blues	Jokerit U20 (Jr. A SM-liiga)
177	Wesley Myron (LW)	Canada	Vancouver Canucks	Victoria Grizzlies (BCHL)
178	Samuel Fejes (LW)	United States	Phoenix Coyotes	Shattuck-St. Mary's (Midget AAA)
179	Marek Mazanec (G)	Czech Republic	Nashville Predators (from NY Rangers)^{4}	HC Plzen (ELH)
180	Artur Gavrus (C)	Belarus	New Jersey Devils	Owen Sound Attack (OHL)
181	Paul LaDue (D)	United States	Los Angeles Kings	Lincoln Stars (USHL)

Notes

1. The Anaheim Ducks' sixth-round pick went to the Toronto Maple Leafs as the result of a trade on June 25, 2011, that sent a sixth-round pick in 2011 to Anaheim in exchange for this pick.
2. The Dallas Stars' sixth-round pick went to the Nashville Predators as the result of a trade on February 24, 2012, that sent Jerred Smithson to Florida in exchange for this pick.
  Florida previously acquired this pick as the result of a trade on December 7, 2011, that sent Jake Hauswirth and a fifth-round pick to Dallas in exchange for Krys Barch and this pick.
3. The Philadelphia Flyers' sixth-round pick went to the Los Angeles Kings as the result of a trade on October 12, 2011, that sent future considerations to Philadelphia in exchange for Stefan Legein and this pick.
4. The New York Rangers' sixth-round pick went to the Nashville Predators as the result of a trade on June 25, 2011, that sent a sixth-round pick in 2011 to New York in exchange for this pick.

=== Round seven ===
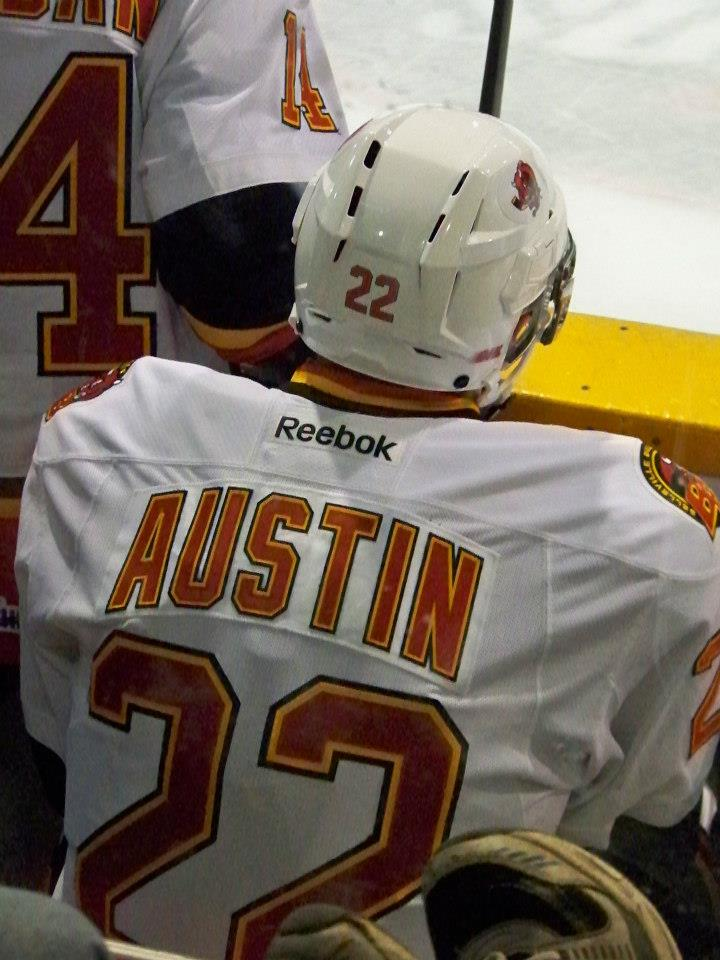
Brady Austin was selected 193rd overall by the Buffalo Sabres.

#	Player	Nationality	NHL team	College/junior/club team
182	Gianluca Curcuruto (D)	Canada	Columbus Blue Jackets	Sault Ste. Marie Greyhounds (OHL)
183	Dmitry Sinitsyn (D)	Russia	Dallas Stars (from Edmonton via Los Angeles)^{1}	University of Massachusetts (Hockey East)
184	Marek Langhamer (G)	Czech Republic	Phoenix Coyotes (from Montreal)^{2}	J Pardubice (Noen ELJ)
185	Jake Bischoff (D)	United States	New York Islanders	Grand Rapids High School (USHS–MN)
186	Matt DeBlouw (C)	United States	Calgary Flames (from Toronto)^{3}	Muskegon Lumberjacks (USHL)
187	Kenton Helgesen (D)	Canada	Anaheim Ducks	Calgary Hitmen (WHL)
188	Louis Nanne (LW)	United States	Minnesota Wild	Edina High School (USHS–MN)
189	Brendan Collier (LW)	United States	Carolina Hurricanes	Malden Catholic High School (USHS–MA)
190	Jamie Phillips (G)	Canada	Winnipeg Jets	Toronto Jr. Canadiens (OJHL)
191	Brandon Whitney (G)	Canada	Chicago Blackhawks (from Tampa Bay via San Jose)^{4}	Victoriaville Tigres (QMJHL)
192	Colin Smith (C)	Canada	Colorado Avalanche	Kamloops Blazers (WHL)
193	Brady Austin (D)	Canada	Buffalo Sabres	Belleville Bulls (OHL)
194	Jonatan Nielsen (D)	Sweden	Florida Panthers (from Dallas)^{5}	Linkopings HC J20 (J20 SuperElit)
195	Christian Djoos (D)	Sweden	Washington Capitals (from Calgary)^{6}	Brynas IF J20 (J20 SuperElit)
196	Mikael Wikstrand (D)	Sweden	Ottawa Senators	Mora IK (Allsvenskan)
197	Jaynen Rissling (D)	Canada	Washington Capitals	Calgary Hitmen (WHL)
198	Joakim Ryan (D)	United States	San Jose Sharks	Cornell University (ECAC)
199	Matt Tomkins (G)	Canada	Chicago Blackhawks	Sherwood Park Crusaders (AJHL)
200	Rasmus Bodin (LW)	Sweden	Detroit Red Wings	Ostersunds IK (Division 1)
201	Valeri Vasilyev (D)	Russia	Philadelphia Flyers	Spartak Moscow (MHL)
202	Nikita Gusev (LW)	Russia	Tampa Bay Lightning (from Nashville)^{7}	CSKA Moscow (MHL)
203	Sergei Kostenko (G)	Russia	Washington Capitals (from Pittsburgh)^{8}	Metallurg Novokuznetsk (MHL)
204	Judd Peterson (C/RW)	United States	Buffalo Sabres (from Florida via Chicago)^{9}	The Marshall School (USHS–MN)
205	Colton Hargrove (LW)	United States	Boston Bruins	Fargo Force (USHL)
206	Tyrel Seaman (C)	Canada	St. Louis Blues	Brandon Wheat Kings (WHL)
207	Matt Beattie (LW)	United States	Vancouver Canucks	Phillips Exeter Academy (USHS–NH)
208	Justin Hache (D)	Canada	Phoenix Coyotes	Shawinigan Cataractes (QMJHL)
209	Viktor Loov (D)	Sweden	Toronto Maple Leafs (from NY Rangers)^{10}	Sodertalje SK (Allsvenskan)
210	Jaycob Megna (D)	United States	Anaheim Ducks (from New Jersey)^{11}	University of Nebraska Omaha (WCHA)
211	Nick Ebert (D)	United States	Los Angeles Kings	Windsor Spitfires (OHL)

Notes

1. The Edmonton Oilers' seventh-round pick went to the Dallas Stars as the result of a trade on June 23, 2012, that sent Dallas' seventh-round pick in 2013 to Los Angeles in exchange for this pick.
  Los Angeles previously acquired this pick as the result of a trade on June 26, 2011, that sent Ryan Smyth to Edmonton in exchange for Colin Fraser and this pick.
2. The Montreal Canadiens' seventh-round pick went to the Phoenix Coyotes as a result of a trade on October 23, 2011, that sent Petteri Nokelainen and Garrett Stafford to Montreal in exchange for Brock Trotter and this pick.
3. The Toronto Maple Leafs' seventh-round pick went to the Calgary Flames as the result of a trade on July 27, 2009, that sent Wayne Primeau and Calgary's second-round draft pick in 2011 to Toronto in exchange for Anton Stralman, Colin Stuart and this pick.
4. The Tampa Bay Lightning's seventh-round pick went to the Chicago Blackhawks as the result of a trade on June 23, 2012, that sent Chicago's fourth-round pick in 2012 to San Jose in exchange for San Jose's fourth-round pick in 2013 and this pick.
  San Jose previously acquired this pick as the result of a trade on February 16, 2012, that sent Minnesota's second-round pick in 2012 to Tampa Bay in exchange for Dominic Moore and this pick.
5. The Dallas Stars' seventh-round pick went to the Florida Panthers as the result of a trade on June 23, 2012, that sent Florida's seventh-round pick in 2013 to Dallas in exchange for this pick.
6. The Calgary Flames' seventh-round pick went to the Washington Capitals as a result of a trade on July 17, 2009, that sent Keith Seabrook to Calgary in exchange for this pick, originally presented as "future considerations".
7. The Nashville Predators' seventh-round pick went to the Tampa Bay Lightning as the result of a trade on June 15, 2012, that sent Sebastien Caron, Minnesota's second-round pick in 2012, Philadelphia's second-round pick in 2012 and Tampa Bay's third-round pick in 2013 to Nashville in exchange for Anders Lindback, Kyle Wilson and this pick.
8. The Pittsburgh Penguins' seventh-round pick went to the Washington Capitals as the result of a trade on June 4, 2012, that sent Tomas Vokoun to Pittsburgh in exchange for this pick.
9. The Florida Panthers' seventh-round pick went to the Buffalo Sabres as the result of a trade on June 29, 2011, that sent Steve Montador to Chicago in exchange for this pick (being conditional at the time of the trade). The condition, which was carried over from an earlier trade between Chicago and Florida – Florida's seventh-round pick in 2012 would be available – was converted on July 7, 2011 when Alexander Sulzer was signed by the Vancouver Canucks, meaning that a condition of a trade between Florida and the Nashville Predators involving Sulzer and this pick did not come into effect.
  Chicago previously acquired the pick as the result of a trade on June 26, 2011, that sent Tomas Kopecky to Florida in exchange for this pick.
10. The New York Rangers' seventh-round pick went to the Toronto Maple Leafs as the result of a trade on February 28, 2011, that sent John Mitchell to New York in exchange for this pick.
11. The New Jersey Devils' seventh-round pick went to the Anaheim Ducks as the result of a trade on December 12, 2011, that sent Kurtis Foster and Timo Pielmeier to New Jersey in exchange for this Rod Pelley, Mark Fraser and this pick.

== Draftees based on nationality ==
Rank	Country	Picks	Percent	Top selection
	North America	154	73.0%	
1	Canada	100	47.4%	Ryan Murray, 2nd
2	United States	54	25.6%	Alex Galchenyuk, 3rd
	Europe	57	27.0%	
3	Sweden	22	10.4%	Hampus Lindholm, 6th
4	Russia	12	5.7%	Nail Yakupov, 1st
5	Finland	9	4.3%	Teuvo Teravainen, 18th
6	Czech Republic	6	2.8%	Radek Faksa, 13th
7	Latvia	2	0.9%	Zemgus Girgensons, 14th
	Denmark	2	0.9%	Frederik Andersen, 87th
	Switzerland	2	0.9%	Tanner Richard, 71st
8	France	1	0.5%	Tim Bozon, 64th
	Belarus	1	0.5%	Artur Gavrus, 180th

== North American draftees by state/province ==
Rank	State/Province	Selections	Top selection
1	Ontario	44	Slater Koekkoek, 10th
2	Alberta	17	Matthew Dumba, 7th
3	Quebec	14	Mike Matheson, 23rd
4	British Columbia	10	Griffin Reinhart, 4th
5	Minnesota	9	Brady Skjei, 28th
6	Saskatchewan	8	Ryan Murray, 2nd
6	Michigan	8	Jacob Trouba, 9th
6	Massachusetts	8	Sam Kurker, 56th
9	New Jersey	4	Anthony Stolarz, 45th
9	Illinois	4	Thomas Di Pauli, 100th
9	Wisconsin	4	Alex Galchenyuk, 3rd
12	New York	3	Dylan Blujus, 40th
12	Manitoba	3	Chris Dreidger, 76th
12	Florida	3	Shayne Gostisbehere, 78th
12	Alaska	3	Austin Wuthrich, 107th
16	Maine	2	Brian Hart, 53rd
16	Colorado	2	Jaccob Slavin, 120th
18	Arizona	1	Henrik Samuelsson, 27th
18	California	1	Nic Kerdiles, 36th
18	Northwest Territories	1	Steven Hodges, 84th
18	Newfoundland and Labrador	1	James Melindy, 88th
18	Virginia	1	Brendan Woods, 129th
18	Connecticut	1	Robert Baillargeon, 136th
18	Pennsylvania	1	Riley Barber, 167th
18	North Dakota	1	Paul LaDue, 181st
18	Nova Scotia	1	Brandon Whitney, 191st
18	Texas	1	Colton Hargrove, 205th
18	New Brunswick	1	Justin Hache, 208th

== See also ==
- 2009–10 NHL transactions
- 2010–11 NHL transactions
- 2011–12 NHL transactions
- 2012–13 NHL season
- List of first overall NHL draft picks
- List of NHL players
