= Simon Fernholm =

Swedish ice hockey player

- Born: March 6, 1994 (age 32) Stockholm, Sweden
- Height: 6 ft 6 in (198 cm)
- Weight: 205 lb (93 kg; 14 st 9 lb)
- Position: Defence
- Shoots: Left
- EIHL team Former teams: Fife Flyers; Frölunda HC
- NHL draft: 164th overall, 2012; Nashville Predators
- Playing career: 2012–present

Simon Oscar Charlie Fernholm (born March 6, 1994) is a Swedish professional ice hockey defenceman, currently playing for Scottish club Fife Flyers in the UK's EIHL. He is the younger brother of Daniel Fernholm. He was selected 164th overall by the Nashville Predators in the 2012 NHL entry draft.

== Playing career ==
Fernholm made his Elitserien début with Frölunda HC on October 28, 2012, in a 6–3 road win against AIK IF, he had a primary assist on the game-winning goal.

In the following 2013–14 season, Fernholm was hampered by a knee injury which limited him to just 16 games with the J20 squad.

On May 26, 2014, Fernholm left Frölunda in order to gain regular playing time and agreed to a one-year deal with IF Troja/Ljungby of the Hockeyettan.

After spells with fellow Swedish clubs AIK IF, Timrå IK, HC Vita Hästen, Västerås IK, in August 2022 Fernholm agreed to join UK Elite Ice Hockey League (EIHL) side Fife Flyers for the 2022–23 season.

== Career statistics ==
			Regular season					Playoffs
Season	Team	League	GP	G	A	Pts	PIM	GP	G	A	Pts	PIM
2010–11	Huddinge IK	J20	2	0	0	0	0	—	—	—	—	—
2011–12	Huddinge IK	J20	47	3	12	15	12	—	—	—	—	—
2012–13	Frölunda HC	J20	41	0	10	10	10	4	0	1	1	2
2012–13	Frölunda HC	SEL	5	0	1	1	0	—	—	—	—	—
2013–14	Frölunda HC	J20	16	3	6	9	8	—	—	—	—	—
2014–15	IF Troja/Ljungby	Div.1	36	2	3	5	20	7	1	2	3	2
2015–16	Timrå IK	J20	2	1	1	2	0	—	—	—	—	—
2015–16	Timrå IK	Allsv	39	1	8	9	10	4	0	1	1	0
2016–17	AIK IF	Allsv	31	2	7	9	6	8	0	2	2	2
2017–18	AIK IF	Allsv	22	1	7	8	4	5	1	2	3	2
2017–18	AIK IF	J20	2	0	1	1	0	—	—	—	—	—
2018–19	AIK IF	Allsv	43	4	7	11	26	7	0	1	1	2
2019–20	HC Vita Hästen	Allsv	52	4	21	25	40	1	0	1	1	2
2020–21	AIK IF	Allsv	26	1	6	7	8	6	0	1	1	0
2021–22	Västerås IK	Allsv	10	0	1	1	4	3	0	0	0	0
SHL totals			5	0	1	1	0	—	—	—	—	—
