= Jerred Smithson =

Canadian ice hockey player

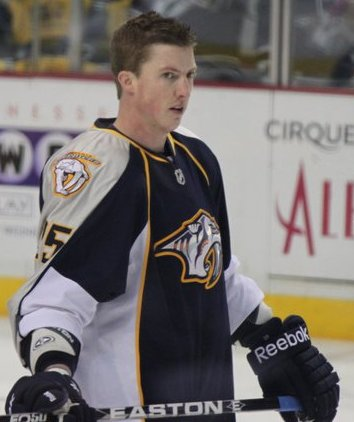
- Born: February 4, 1979 (age 47) Vernon, British Columbia, Canada
- Height: 6 ft 3 in (191 cm)
- Weight: 209 lb (95 kg; 14 st 13 lb)
- Position: Centre
- Shot: Right
- Played for: Los Angeles Kings; Nashville Predators; Florida Panthers; Edmonton Oilers; Toronto Maple Leafs; Herning Blue Fox
- NHL draft: Undrafted
- Playing career: 2000–2016

Jerred Smithson (born February 4, 1979) is a Canadian former professional ice hockey centre who played in the National Hockey League (NHL).

== Playing career ==
Undrafted, Smithson played in the Western Hockey League with the Calgary Hitmen before he signed his first NHL contract as a free agent with the Los Angeles Kings.

Smithson scored the game-winning goal for the Nashville Predators in Game 5 of the 2011 Stanley Cup Playoffs quarterfinals to beat the Anaheim Ducks 3-2. The Predators went on to defeat the Ducks in 6 games to preserve their first ever playoff series win.

On February 24, 2012, Smithson was traded by the Predators to the Florida Panthers for a 2012 sixth round draft pick.

April 3, 2013 he was acquired by the Edmonton Oilers from the Florida Panthers in exchange for a fourth round pick in the 2013 Draft.

As a free agent leading into the 2013–14 season, Smithson signed a professional try-out contract with the Toronto Marlies of the American Hockey League on October 16, 2013.

After 7 games with the Marlies, on November 6, 2013, Smithson returned to the NHL in signing a one-year contract with parent club, the Toronto Maple Leafs. Smithson later made his Leafs debut on November 8, 2013. Smithson was waived by the Maple Leafs on December 4, 2013, and after clearing waivers reported to the AHL Toronto Marlies.

After sitting out the 2014–15 season as a free agent, Smithson announced a comeback to professional hockey in agreeing to a one-year contract with Danish club, Herning Blue Fox of the Metal Ligaen on July 25, 2015. In his solitary season abroad in 2015–16, Smithson contributed with 24 points in 33 games, helping the Blue Fox to the finals in the post-season with 7 points in 19 playoff games. He announced his retirement from professional hockey following the season.

== Career statistics ==
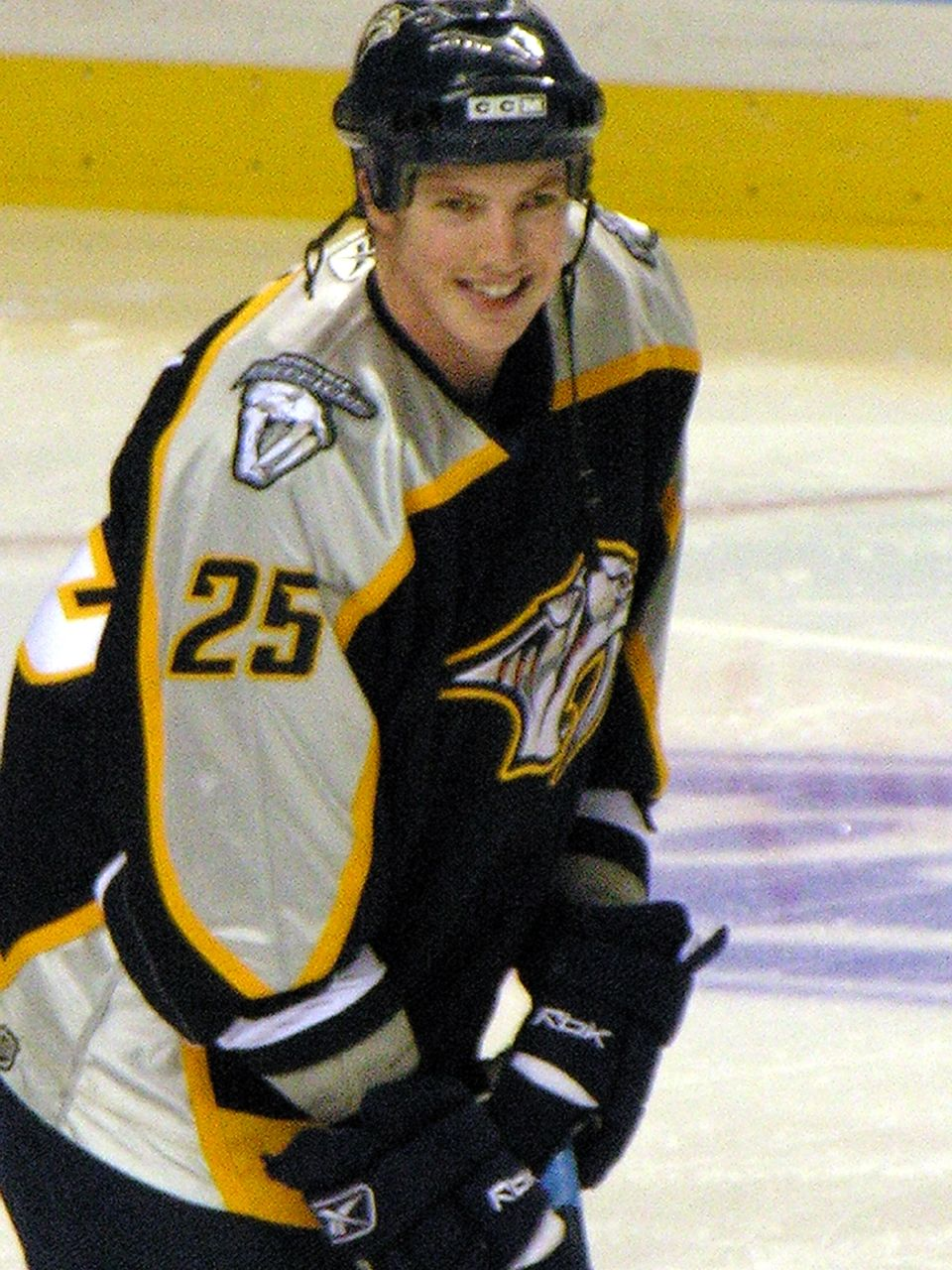
Smithson with the Predators in 2006.

			Regular season					Playoffs
Season	Team	League	GP	G	A	Pts	PIM	GP	G	A	Pts	PIM
1995–96	Calgary Hitmen	WHL	60	4	2	6	16	—	—	—	—	—
1996–97	Calgary Hitmen	WHL	65	3	6	9	49	—	—	—	—	—
1997–98	Calgary Hitmen	WHL	65	12	9	21	65	18	0	2	2	25
1998–99	Calgary Hitmen	WHL	63	14	22	36	108	21	3	7	10	17
1999–00	Calgary Hitmen	WHL	66	14	25	39	111	10	1	1	2	16
2000–01	Trenton Titans	ECHL	3	0	1	1	2	—	—	—	—	—
2000–01	Lowell Lock Monsters	AHL	24	1	1	2	10	4	0	0	0	2
2001–02	Manchester Monarchs	AHL	78	5	13	18	45	5	0	1	1	4
2002–03	Manchester Monarchs	AHL	38	4	21	25	60	3	0	0	0	4
2002–03	Los Angeles Kings	NHL	22	0	2	2	21	—	—	—	—	—
2003–04	Manchester Monarchs	AHL	66	7	13	20	51	6	0	1	1	10
2003–04	Los Angeles Kings	NHL	8	0	1	1	4	—	—	—	—	—
2004–05	Milwaukee Admirals	AHL	80	11	11	22	92	5	0	0	0	4
2005–06	Milwaukee Admirals	AHL	8	0	0	0	12	—	—	—	—	—
2005–06	Nashville Predators	NHL	66	5	9	14	54	3	0	0	0	4
2006–07	Nashville Predators	NHL	64	5	7	12	42	5	0	0	0	17
2007–08	Nashville Predators	NHL	81	7	9	16	50	6	0	0	0	2
2008–09	Nashville Predators	NHL	82	4	9	13	49	—	—	—	—	—
2009–10	Nashville Predators	NHL	69	9	4	13	54	6	1	0	1	6
2010–11	Nashville Predators	NHL	82	5	8	13	34	11	1	1	2	8
2011–12	Nashville Predators	NHL	53	1	4	5	30	—	—	—	—	—
2011–12	Florida Panthers	NHL	16	0	1	1	4	5	0	1	1	2
2012–13	Florida Panthers	NHL	35	2	3	5	10	—	—	—	—	—
2012–13	Edmonton Oilers	NHL	10	1	0	1	2	—	—	—	—	—
2013–14	Toronto Marlies	AHL	51	2	9	11	63	13	1	2	3	6
2013–14	Toronto Maple Leafs	NHL	18	0	0	0	9	—	—	—	—	—
2015–16	Herning Blue Fox	DEN	33	8	16	24	36	19	4	3	7	31
NHL totals			606	39	57	96	363	36	2	2	4	39
