= Dan Fascinato =

Canadian ice hockey player

- Born: January 22, 1961 (age 65) Guelph, Ontario, Canada
- Height: 6 ft 1 in (185 cm)
- Weight: 195 lb (88 kg; 13 st 13 lb)
- Position: Defence
- Shot: Left
- Played for: CHL; Fort Worth Texans; Wichita Wind; IHL; Muskegon Mohawks; Serie A HC Varese; HC Milano Saima; BNL; Durham Wasps
- National team: Italy
- NHL draft: 127th overall, 1980; Colorado Rockies
- Playing career: 1981–1993

Dan Valentino Fascinato (born January 23, 1961) is a Canadian-born former professional ice hockey defenceman. Fascinato was selected by the Colorado Rockies in the seventh round (127th overall) of the 1980 NHL entry draft.

Fascinato played major junior hockey in the Ontario Hockey League (OHL) with the Ottawa 67's before turning professional after completing final junior season to play in the 1981 Central Hockey League playoffs with the Fort Worth Texans.

== International ==
Fascinato played with the Italy men's national ice hockey team at both the 1989 and 1990 Men's World Ice Hockey Championships (Group B).

== Career statistics ==
			Regular season					Playoffs
Season	Team	League	GP	G	A	Pts	PIM	GP	G	A	Pts	PIM
1979–80	Ottawa 67's	OMJHL	68	4	35	39	36	—	—	—	—	—
1980–81	Ottawa 67's	OHL	68	4	37	41	42	—	—	—	—	—
1980–81	Fort Worth Texans	CHL	—	—	—	—	—	5	0	3	3	2
1981–82	Fort Worth Texans	CHL	71	2	23	25	41	—	—	—	—	—
1982–83	Wichita Wind	CHL	38	3	8	11	10	—	—	—	—	—
1982–83	Muskegon Mohawks	IHL	36	4	17	21	22	—	—	—	—	—
1983–84	SG Cortina	Italy	28	10	27	37	14	—	—	—	—	—
1984–85	HC Varese	Italy	34	17	43	60	32	—	—	—	—	—
1985–86	HC Varese	Italy	35	11	38	49	62	—	—	—	—	—
1986–87	HC Varese	Italy	36	10	28	38	48	—	—	—	—	—
1987–88	HC Varese	Italy	36	2	20	22	32	—	—	—	—	—
1988–89	HC Milano Saima	Italy	44	13	31	44	25	—	—	—	—	—
1989–90	HC Milano Saima	Italy	42	21	21	42	20	—	—	—	—	—
1990–91	HC Milano Saima	Italy	46	8	34	42	21	—	—	—	—	—
1991–92	HC Milano Saima	Alpenliga	19	1	3	4	12	—	—	—	—	—
1991–92	HC Milano Saima	Italy	16	1	13	14	4	12	1	7	8	8
1992–93	Durham Wasps	BHL	8	4	3	7	0	—	—	—	—	—
Italy totals			317	93	255	348	258	12	1	7	8	8
