= 1950–51 Serie A (ice hockey) season =

18th season of Italian Serie A Ice Hockey

The 1950–51 Serie A season was the 18th season of the Serie A, the top level of ice hockey in Italy. Nine teams participated in the league, and HC Milan Inter won the championship.

== First round ==
=== Group A ===
	Club
1.	HC Milan Inter
2.	HC Diavoli Rossoneri Milano
3.	HC Amatori Milano

=== Group B ===
	Club
1.	Auronzo
2.	HC Gherdëina
3.	SG Cortina

=== Group C ===
	Club
1.	HC Alleghe
2.	HC Bolzano
3.	Asiago Hockey

== Final round ==
	Club	GP	W	T	L	GF–GA	Pts
1.	HC Milan Inter	2	2	0	0	20:1	4
2.	Auronzo	2	1	0	1	7:10	2
3.	HC Alleghe	2	0	0	2	5:21	0
