= 1953–54 Serie A (ice hockey) season =

Italian professional ice hockey season

The 1953–54 Serie A season was the 21st season of the Serie A, the top level of ice hockey in Italy. Eight teams participated in the league, and HC Milan Inter won the championship.

== Regular season ==
	Club	Pts
1.	HC Milan Inter	14
2.	HC Bolzano	10
3.	HC Diavoli Rossoneri Milano	10
4.	SG Cortina	8
5.	Auronzo	6
6.	HC Gherdëina	6
7.	HC Alleghe	2
8.	Asiago Hockey	0
