= Jim Corsi (ice hockey) =

Italian-Canadian ice hockey player (born 1954)

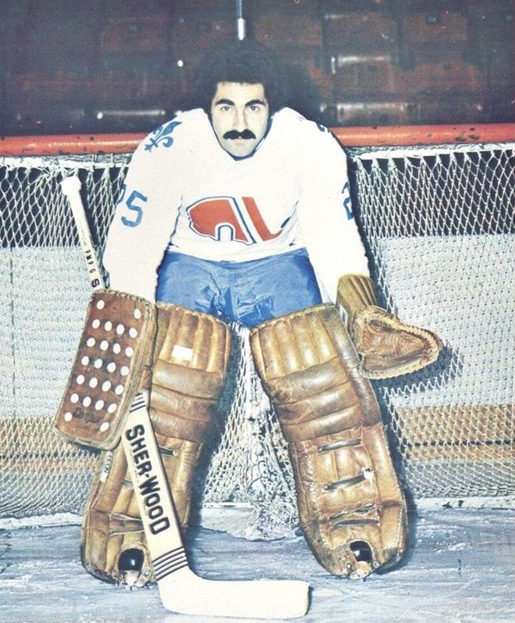
- Corsi in 1979 photo
- Born: June 19, 1954 (age 72) Montreal, Quebec, Canada
- Height: 5 ft 9 in (175 cm)
- Weight: 178 lb (81 kg; 12 st 10 lb)
- Position: Goaltender
- Caught: Left
- Played for: Quebec Nordiques; Edmonton Oilers; HC Gherdëina; SG Cortina; HC Bolzano; Varese HC
- National team: Italy
- NHL draft: Undrafted
- Playing career: 1976–1992

James Corsi (born June 19, 1954) is a Canadian-Italian former professional ice hockey goaltender and the current goaltending coach for the Columbus Blue Jackets. He was previously the goaltender coach of the St. Louis Blues and the Buffalo Sabres. Before beginning his hockey career, Corsi also played soccer at the professional level as a forward in the North American Soccer League for the Montreal Olympique. The following season he played in the National Soccer League with the Quebec Selects.

== Playing career ==
Corsi played in the World Hockey Association for the Quebec Nordiques and the National Hockey League for the Edmonton Oilers. He has dual Italian and Canadian citizenship. He became the goaltender of the nazionale (Italian national ice hockey team) and spent the majority of his career with Varese. He also played for HC Gherdëina, SG Cortina and HC Bolzano during his time in Italy's Serie A league. Corsi played on the Italian team at the 1982 World Championship that stunned a Team Canada that had Wayne Gretzky on it by tying Canada 3-3 and went on to beat the US at the same tournament relegating them to the B-Pool for 1983.

== Post-playing career ==
Corsi is also known as being the namesake for the development of the Corsi rating. This indicator is essentially a plus-minus statistic that measures shot attempts (usually only counting those at even strength). A player receives a plus for any shot attempt (on net, missed, or blocked) that his team directs at the opponent's net, and a minus for any shot attempt against his own net. This indicator is widely used in most NHL teams as it has shown a strong correlation to player and team success. The person credited with popularizing the statistic, Vic Ferrari attributed the stat to then-Sabres general manager Darcy Regier but named it after Corsi because he thought Corsi's name had a better ring to it (he was inadvertently correct since Corsi did create the statistic). Corsi himself has stated he is flattered to be associated with the statistic.

He was relieved of his duties with the St. Louis Blues on February 1, 2017.

== Teams ==
Soccer

- Montreal Olympique 1971, 1973
- Quebec Selects 1974

Hockey

- Maine Nordiques 1976–77
- Quebec Nordiques 1977–78
- Binghamton Dusters 1978–79
- Quebec Nordiques 1978–79
- Houston Apollos 1979–80
- Oklahoma City Stars 1979–80
- Edmonton Oilers 1979–80
- HC Gardena Finstral Ortisei 1980–1982
- SG Cortina 1982–1983
- HC Bolzano Würth 1983–1984
- Varese HC 1987–92

== Coaching ==
- Goaltending coach: Buffalo Sabres 2001–2014
- Goaltending Coach: St. Louis Blues 2014–2017

== Career statistics ==
=== Regular season and playoffs ===
			Regular season									Playoffs
Season	Team	League	GP	W	L	T	MIN	GA	SO	GAA	SV%	GP	W	L	MIN	GA	SO	GAA	SV%
1973–74	Loyola College	CIAU	11	—	—	—	660	30	1	2.73	—	—	—	—	—	—	—	—	—
1974–75	Loyala College	CIAU	40	—	—	—	2359	109	2	2.72	—	—	—	—	—	—	—	—	—
1975–76	Concordia University	CIAU	20	19	0	1	1200	36	2	1.80	—	—	—	—	—	—	—	—	—
1976–77	Maine Nordiques	NAHL	54	—	—	—	2988	181	1	3.57	.896	12	7	5	714	46	1	3.87	—
1977–78	Quebec Nordiques	WHA	23	10	7	0	1089	82	0	4.52	.873	—	—	—	—	—	—	—	—
1978–79	Quebec Nordiques	WHA	40	16	20	1	2291	126	3	3.30	.899	2	0	1	66	7	0	6.36	—
1978–79	Binghamton Dusters	AHL	4	1	2	0	211	7	0	1.99	—	—	—	—	—	—	—	—	—
1979–80	Edmonton Oilers	NHL	26	8	14	3	1360	83	0	3.66	.874	—	—	—	—	—	—	—	—
1979–80	Houston Apollos	CHL	17	8	5	2	959	57	0	3.57	.880	—	—	—	—	—	—	—	—
1979–80	Oklahoma City Stars	CHL	11	5	6	0	645	28	1	2.60	.916	—	—	—	—	—	—	—	—
1980–81	SG Cortina	ITA	—	—	—	—	—	—	—	—	—	—	—	—	—	—	—	—	—
1981–82	HC Gherdëina	ITA	—	—	—	—	—	—	—	—	—	—	—	—	—	—	—	—	—
1982–83	HC Gherdëina	ITA	—	—	—	—	—	—	—	—	—	—	—	—	—	—	—	—	—
1983–84	HC Bolzano	ITA	18	16	1	1	1080	60	—	3.33	—	6	4	2	360	28	0	4.67	—
1984–85	AS Varese Hockey	ITA	—	—	—	—	—	—	—	—	—	—	—	—	—	—	—	—	—
1985–86	AS Varese Hockey	ITA	—	—	—	—	—	—	—	—	—	—	—	—	—	—	—	—	—
1986–87	AS Varese Hockey	ITA	36	—	—	—	2134	103	1	2.90	—	—	—	—	—	—	—	—	—
1987–88	AS Varese Hockey	ITA	36	—	—	—	—	—	—	—	—	—	—	—	—	—	—	—	—
1988–89	AS Varese Hockey	ITA	42	—	—	—	2520	116	0	2.76	—	5	—	—	300	8	1	1.60	—
1989–90	AS Varese Hockey	ITA	—	—	—	—	—	—	—	—	—	—	—	—	—	—	—	—	—
1990–91	AS Varese Hockey	ITA	44	—	—	—	2610	165	0	3.79	—	—	—	—	—	—	—	—	—
1991–92	AS Varese Hockey	AL	18	—	—	—	—	—	—	—	—	10	—	—	—	—	—	—	—
WHA totals			63	26	27	1	3380	208	3	3.69	.890	2	0	1	66	7	0	6.36	—
NHL totals			26	8	14	3	1360	83	0	3.66	.874	—	—	—	—	—	—	—	—

=== International ===
Year	Team	Event	GP	W	L	T	MIN	GA	SO	GAA	SV%
1981	Italy	WC B	7	6	0	1	420	18	0	2.57	.932
1982	Italy	WC	7	1	5	1	390	38	0	5.84	.879
1983	Italy	WC	10	1	8	1	568	50	0	5.28	.876
1985	Italy	WC B	7	5	0	2	420	22	0	3.14	.904
1986	Italy	WC B	7	4	3	0	420	16	1	2.29	.918
1987	Italy	WC B	7	2	4	1	420	29	0	4.14	.885
1989	Italy	WC B	7	5	1	1	420	16	2	2.29	.871
1990	Italy	WC B	5	2	2	1	299	14	0	2.81	.897
Senior totals			57	26	23	8	3357	203	3	3.63	—
