= 1952–53 Serie A (ice hockey) season =

Italian professional ice hockey season

The 1952–53 Serie A season was the 20th season of the Serie A, the top level of ice hockey in Italy. Six teams participated in the league, and HC Diavoli Rossoneri Milano won the championship.

== First round ==
=== Group A ===
	Club	Pts
1.	SG Cortina	6
2.	HC Ortisei	6
3.	HC Bolzano	0

=== Group B ===
	Club	Pts
1.	Auronzo	6
2.	HC Alleghe	4
3.	HC Asiago	2

== Final round ==
	Club	Pts
1.	HC Diavoli Rossoneri Milano	6
2.	HC Milan Inter	4
3.	SG Cortina	2
4.	Auronzo	0
