= 1951–52 Serie A (ice hockey) season =

Italian professional ice hockey season

The 1951–52 Serie A season was the 19th season of the Serie A, the top level of ice hockey in Italy. Six teams participated in the league, and HC Milan Inter won the championship.

== First round ==
=== Group A ===
	Club	Pts
1.	Auronzo	6
2.	SG Cortina	4
3.	HC Gherdëina	2

=== Group B ===
	Club	Pts
1.	Asiago Hockey	6
2.	HC Alleghe	2
3.	HC Bolzano	0

== Final round ==
	Club	Pts
1.	HC Milan Inter	6
2.	HC Diavoli Rossoneri Milano	4
3.	Auronzo	2
4.	Asiago Hockey	0
