= 1949–50 Serie A (ice hockey) season =

Italian professional ice hockey season

The 1949–50 Serie A season was the 17th season of the Serie A, the top level of ice hockey in Italy. Nine teams participated in the league, and HC Milan Inter won the championship.

== First round ==
=== Group A ===
	Club	GP	W	T	L	GF–GA	Pts
1.	HC Milan Inter	2	2	0	0	35:2	4
2.	HC Alleghe	2	1	0	1	7:18	2
3.	Asiago Hockey	2	0	0	2	6:28	0

=== Group B ===
	Club	GP	W	T	L	GF–GA	Pts
1.	SG Cortina	2	2	0	0	9:5	4
2.	Auronzo	2	1	0	1	5:9	2
3.	HC Diavoli Rossoneri Milano	2	0	0	2	0:0	0

=== Group C ===
	Club	GP	W	T	L	GF–GA	Pts
1.	HC Amatori Milano	2	1	1	0	5:3	3
2.	HC Gherdëina	2	1	0	1	6:3	2
3.	HC Bolzano	2	0	1	1	2:7	1

== Final round ==
	Club	GP	W	T	L	GF–GA	Pts
1.	HC Milan Inter	2	2	0	0	16:9	4
2.	HC Amatori Milano	2	1	0	1	8:11	2
3.	SG Cortina	2	0	0	2	6:10	0
