= 1948–49 Serie A (ice hockey) season =

Italian professional ice hockey season

The 1948–49 Serie A season was the 16th season of the Serie A, the top level of ice hockey in Italy. Nine teams participated in the league, and HC Diavoli Rossoneri Milano won the championship.

== First round ==
=== Group A ===
	Club	GP	W	T	L	GF–GA	Pts
1.	Hockey Club Milano	2	2	0	0	11:3	4
2.	HC Gherdëina	2	1	0	1	3:11	2
3.	Tofana	2	0	0	2	0:0	0

=== Group B ===
	Club	GP	W	T	L	GF–GA	Pts
1.	HC Diavoli Rossoneri Milano	2	1	1	0	5:4	3
2.	HC Bolzano	2	1	0	1	8:7	2
3.	SG Cortina	2	0	1	1	8:10	1

=== Group C ===
	Club	GP	W	T	L	GF–GA	Pts
1.	HC Amatori Milano	2	2	0	0	6:2	4
2.	HC Alleghe	2	1	0	1	5:6	2
3.	Asiago Hockey	2	0	0	2	4:7	0

== Final round ==
	Club	GP	W	T	L	GF–GA	Pts
1.	HC Diavoli Rossoneri Milano	2	2	0	0	15:5	4
2.	Hockey Club Milano	2	1	0	1	8:8	2
3.	HC Amatori Milano	2	0	0	2	5:15	0
