= 1947–48 Serie A (ice hockey) season =

Italian professional ice hockey season

The 1947–48 Serie A season was the 15th season of the Serie A, the top level of ice hockey in Italy. 11 teams participated in the league, and Hockey Club Milano won the championship.

== First round ==
=== Group A ===
	Club	GP	W	T	L	Goals	Pts
1.	Misurina	2	2	0	0	7:0	4
2.	HC Alleghe	2	1	0	1	3:2	2
3.	SG Cortina II	2	0	0	2	0:8	2

=== Group B ===
	Club	GP	W	T	L	Goals	Pts
1.	HC Diavoli Rossoneri Milano	2	1	0	1	3:2	2
2.	Diavoli Azzurri Bolzano	2	1	0	1	2:2	2
3.	HC Ortisei	2	1	0	1	3:4	2

=== Group C ===
	Club	GP	W	T	L	Goals	Pts
1.	HC Amatori Milano	2	2	0	0	15:1	4
2.	HC Merano	2	1	0	1	5:12	2
3.	Asiaghese	2	0	0	2	3:10	0

== Qualification round ==
	Club	GP	W	T	L	Goals	Pts
1.	HC Amatori Milano	2	1	1	0	15:9	3
2.	Misurina	2	1	0	1	10:8	3
3.	HC Diavoli Rossoneri Milano	2	0	0	2	7:15	0

== Playoffs ==
=== Semifinals ===
- SG Cortina II - Amatori Milano 8:1

=== Final ===
- Hockey Club Milano - SG Cortina II (F)
