= 1930–31 Serie A (ice hockey) season =

Italian professional ice hockey season

The 1930–31 Serie A season was the fifth season of the Serie A, the top level of ice hockey in Italy. Six teams participated in the league, and Hockey Club Milano won the championship by defeating GSD Cortina in the final.

== Regular season ==
=== Group A ===
	Club	GP	W	T	L	GF–GA	Pts
1.	Hockey Club Milano I	2	2	0	0	28:0	4
2.	HC Gherdëina	2	1	0	1	5:12	2
3.	SP Varese	2	0	0	2	0:21	0

=== Group B ===
	Club	GP	W	T	L	GF–GA	Pts
1.	GSD Cortina	2	2	0	0	14:0	4
2.	Hockey Club Milano II	2	1	0	1	5:4	2
3.	Excelsior Milano	2	0	0	2	0:15	0

== 3rd place ==
- Hockey Club Milano II - HC Gherdëina 3:1

== Final ==
- Hockey Club Milano - GSD Cortina 6:1
