= 1974–75 Serie A (ice hockey) season =

Italian professional ice hockey season

The 1974–75 Serie A season was the 41st season of the Serie A, the top level of ice hockey in Italy. 10 teams participated in the league, and SG Cortina won the championship.

== Final round ==
	Club	Pts
1.	SG Cortina	47
2.	HC Bolzano	46
3.	HC Gherdëina	43
4.	HC Alleghe	32
5.	HC Meran	23
6.	Asiago Hockey	15

== Placing round ==
	Club	Pts
7.	HC Brunico	18
8.	Auronzo	17
9.	HC Diavoli Milano	14
10.	Latemar	7
