= 1973–74 Serie A (ice hockey) season =

Italian professional ice hockey season

The 1973–74 Serie A season was the 40th season of the Serie A, the top level of ice hockey in Italy. 10 teams participated in the league, and SG Cortina won the championship.

== Final round ==
	Club	Pts
1.	SG Cortina	52
2.	HC Bolzano	43
3.	HC Alleghe	38
4.	HC Gherdëina	35
5.	HC Meran	25
6.	HC Diavoli Milano	20

== Placing round ==
	Club	Pts
7.	HC Brunico	17
8.	Asiago Hockey	16
9.	Latemar	13
10.	Auronzo	5
