= Giancarlo Agazzi =

Italian ice hockey player (1932 – 1995)

- Born: August 22, 1932; Milan, Italy
- Died: September 26, 1995 (aged 63); Milan, Italy
- Position: Right Wing
- Shot: Right
- Played for: HC Amatori Milano; HC Milano; HC Torino; Milan-Inter HC; Diavoli HC Milano
- National team: Italy
- Playing career: 1950–1966

Giancarlo Agazzi (August 22, 1932 – September 26, 1995) was an Italian ice hockey player.

Considered one of the best Italian hockey players of all time, he played mostly with teams from Milan: HC Amatori Milano, HC Milano, Milan-Inter HC and Diavoli HC Milano. He won the Serie A six times and the Spengler Cup twice. He also played 120 games with Italy men's national ice hockey team, scoring 54 goals. He represented Italy in two Winter Olympics: Cortina d'Ampezzo 1956 and Innsbruck 1964.

After retiring from play, he became a coach, then a member of the Lombard committee of Federazione Italiana Sport del Ghiaccio.
