= 1969–70 Serie A (ice hockey) season =

Italian professional ice hockey season

The 1969–70 Serie A season was the 36th season of the Serie A, the top level of ice hockey in Italy. Four teams participated in the league, and SG Cortina won the championship.

== Regular season ==
	Club	Pts
1.	SG Cortina	18
2.	HC Gherdëina	9
3.	HC Diavoli Milano	5
4.	HC Bolzano	4
