= 1964–65 Serie A (ice hockey) season =

Hockey Event in Italy

The 1964–65 Serie A season was the 31st season of the Serie A, the top level of ice hockey in Italy. Six teams participated in the league, and SG Cortina won the championship.

== First round ==
	Club	Pts
1.	SG Cortina	16
2.	HC Bolzano	12
3.	HC Gherdëina	15
4.	HC Diavoli Milano	8
5.	SSV Bozen	4
6.	HC Alleghe	3

== Final round ==
	Club	Pts
1.	SG Cortina	22
2.	HC Bolzano	18
3.	HC Gherdëina	15
