= 1960–61 Serie A (ice hockey) season =

Italian professional ice hockey season

The 1960–61 Serie A season was the 27th season of the Serie A, the top level of ice hockey in Italy. Four teams participated in the league, and SG Cortina won the championship by defeating HC Diavoli Milano in the final.

== Regular season ==
	Club	Pts
1.	SG Cortina	10
2.	HC Diavoli Milano	10
3.	HC Bolzano	4
4.	HC Gherdëina	0

== Final ==
- SG Cortina - HC Diavoli Milano 4:0
