= 1965–66 Serie A (ice hockey) season =

Italian ice hockey season

The 1965–66 Serie A season was the 32nd season of the Serie A, the top level of ice hockey in Italy. Five teams participated in the league, and SG Cortina won the championship.

== First round ==
| | Club | Pts |
|---|---|---|
| 1. | SG Cortina | 12 |
| 2. | HC Gherdëina | 11 |
| 3. | HC Diavoli Milano | 9 |
| 4. | HC Bolzano | 8 |
| 5. | HC Alleghe | 0 |

== Final round ==
| | Club | Pts |
|---|---|---|
| 1. | SG Cortina | 18 |
| 2. | HC Gherdëina | 13 |
| 3. | HC Diavoli Milano | 13 |
