= 1929–30 Serie A (ice hockey) season =

Italian professional ice hockey season

The 1929–30 Serie A season was the fourth season of the Serie A, the top level of ice hockey in Italy. Seven teams participated in the league, and Hockey Club Milano won the championship by defeating GSD Cortina in the final.

== Regular season ==
=== Group A ===
| | Club | GP | W | T | L | GF–GA | Pts |
|---|---|---|---|---|---|---|---|
| 1. | Hockey Club Milano II | 2 | 2 | 0 | 0 | 9:0 | 4 |
| 2. | HC Gherdëina | 2 | 1 | 0 | 1 | 2:4 | 2 |
| 3. | Società Pattinatori Valentino Torino | 2 | 0 | 0 | 2 | 0:7 | 0 |

=== Group B ===
| | Club | GP | W | T | L | GF–GA | Pts |
|---|---|---|---|---|---|---|---|
| 1. | GSD Cortina | 2 | 2 | 0 | 0 | 17:1 | 4 |
| 2. | SC Bolzano-Renon | 2 | 1 | 0 | 1 | 5:5 | 2 |
| 3. | SP Varese | 2 | 0 | 0 | 2 | 1:17 | 0 |

== Final-Qualification ==
- GSD Cortina - Hockey Club Milano II 2:0

== Final ==
- Hockey Club Milano - GSD Cortina 3:0
