= 1961–62 Serie A (ice hockey) season =

Italian professional ice hockey season

The 1961–62 Serie A season was the 28th season of the Serie A, the top level of ice hockey in Italy. Four teams participated in the league, and SG Cortina won the championship.

== Regular season ==
	Club	Pts
1.	SG Cortina	21
2.	HC Diavoli Milano	14
3.	HC Bolzano	12
4.	HC Gherdëina	1
