= 1954–55 Serie A (ice hockey) season =

Italian professional ice hockey season

The 1954–55 Serie A season was the 22nd season of the Serie A, the top level of ice hockey in Italy. Eight teams participated in the league, and HC Milan Inter won the championship.

== First round ==
=== Group A ===
	Club	Pts
1.	HC Bolzano	11
2.	SG Cortina	9
3.	HC Turin	4
4.	HC Gherdëina	0

=== Group B ===
	Club	Pts
1.	HC Milan Inter	12
2.	Auronzo	8
3.	HC Alleghe	4
4.	HC Diavoli Rossoneri Milano	0

== Final round ==
	Club	Pts
1.	HC Milan Inter	6
2.	HC Bolzano	4
3.	SG Cortina	1
4.	Auronzo	1
