= 1968–69 Serie A (ice hockey) season =

Italian professional ice hockey season

The 1968–69 Serie A season was the 35th season of the Serie A, the top level of ice hockey in Italy. Four teams participated in the league, and HC Gherdeina won the championship.

== Regular season ==
	Club	Pts
1.	HC Gherdëina	19
2.	SG Cortina	18
3.	HC Diavoli Milano	8
4.	HC Bolzano	3
