= 1946–47 Serie A (ice hockey) season =

Italian professional ice hockey season

The 1946–47 Serie A season was the 14th season of the Serie A, the top level of ice hockey in Italy. Hockey Club Milano won the championship by defeating HC Diavoli Rossoneri Milano in the final.

== Qualification ==
The two Serie B group winners played against each other for the right to participate in the Serie A.

- Misurina - Hockey Club Milano II 3:2

== Regular season ==
	Club
1.	Hockey Club Milano
2.	HC Diavoli Rossoneri Milano
3.	SG Cortina
3.	Misurina

== Playoffs ==
=== Semifinals ===
- HC Diavoli Rossoneri Milano - Misurina 13:2
- Hockey Club Milano - SG Cortina

=== 3rd place ===
- SG Cortina - Misurina 7:3 (2:1, 3:2, 2:0)

=== Final ===
- Hockey Club Milano - HC Diavoli Rossoneri Milano 2:1
