= 1971–72 Serie A (ice hockey) season =

Italian professional ice hockey season

The 1971–72 Serie A season was the 38th season of the Serie A, the top level of ice hockey in Italy. Eight teams participated in the league, and SG Cortina won the championship.

== Final round ==
	Club	Pts
1.	SG Cortina	35
2.	HC Diavoli Milano	26
3.	HC Bolzano	25
4.	HC Gherdëina	19

== Placing round ==
	Club	Pts
5.	HC Meran	25
6.	HC Alleghe	16
7.	Asiago Hockey	9
8.	Auronzo	5
