= 1933–34 Serie A (ice hockey) season =

Italian professional ice hockey season

The 1933–34 Serie A season was the eighth season of the Serie A, the top level of ice hockey in Italy. Hockey Club Milano won the championship by defeating GSD Cortina in the final.

== Qualification ==
=== Quarterfinals ===
- SG Cortina - HC Diavoli Rossoneri Milano II 1-0
- Ortisei - HC Bolzano 1-2
- Hockey Club Milano II - GUF Torino 8-1

=== Semifinals ===
- SG Cortina - HC Bolzano 4-1
- HC Diavoli Rossoneri Milano - Hockey Club Milano II 2-0

=== Final ===
- SG Cortina - HC Diavoli Rossoneri Milano 4-2

== Final ==
- Hockey Club Milano - SG Cortina 2-0 on series (2-0, 4-1)
