= 1963–64 Serie A (ice hockey) season =

Ice hockey season

The 1963–64 Serie A season was the 30th season of the Serie A, the top level of ice hockey in Italy. Six teams participated in the league, and SG Cortina won the championship.

== First round ==
	Club	Pts
1.	SG Cortina	19
2.	HC Bolzano	16
3.	HC Gherdëina	11
4.	HC Diavoli Milano	8
5.	SSV Bozen	6
6.	HC Turin	0

== Final round ==
	Club	Pts
1.	SG Cortina	27
2.	HC Bolzano	16
3.	Ortisei	15
