= 1956–57 Serie A (ice hockey) season =

Italian professional ice hockey season

The 1956–57 Serie A season was the 23rd season of the Serie A, the top level of ice hockey in Italy. Six teams participated in the league, and SG Cortina won the championship.

== Regular season ==
	Club	Pts
1.	SG Cortina	18
2.	Milan-Inter HC	15
3.	Auronzo	10
4.	HC Turin	9
5.	HC Bolzano	8
6.	HC Gherdëina	0
