= 1936–37 Serie A (ice hockey) season =

Sports season

The 1936–37 Serie A season was the 11th season of the Serie A, the top level of ice hockey in Italy. Two teams participated in the league, and Hockey Club Milano won the championship.

== Regular season ==
	Club	Pts
1.	Hockey Club Milano	6
2.	HC Diavoli Rossoneri Milano	0
