= 1958–59 Serie A (ice hockey) season =

Italian professional ice hockey season

The 1958–59 Serie A season was the 25th season of the Serie A, the top level of ice hockey in Italy. Four teams participated in the league, and SG Cortina won the championship.

== Regular season ==
	Club	Pts
1.	SG Cortina	22
2.	HC Diavoli Milano	14
3.	HC Bolzano	11
4.	Auronzo	1
