= 1926–27 Serie A (ice hockey) season =

Italian professional ice hockey season

The 1926–27 Serie A season was the third season of the Serie A, the top level of ice hockey in Italy. Two teams participated in the league, and Hockey Club Milano won the championship by defeating GSD Cortina in the final.

== Final ==
- Hockey Club Milano - GSD Cortina 7:1 (6:1, 1:0)
