= 1957–58 Serie A (ice hockey) season =

Italian professional ice hockey season

The 1957–58 Serie A season was the 24th season of the Serie A, the top level of ice hockey in Italy. Six teams participated in the league, and Milan-Inter HC won the championship.

== Regular season ==
	Club	Pts
1.	Milan-Inter HC	18
2.	SG Cortina	15
3.	HC Bolzano	12
4.	Scoiattoli Bolzano	8
5.	Auronzo	5
6.	HC Gherdëina	0
