= 1967–68 Serie A (ice hockey) season =

Italian professional ice hockey season

The 1967–68 Serie A season was the 34th season of the Serie A, the top level of ice hockey in Italy. Four teams participated in the league, and SG Cortina won the championship by defeating HC Diavoli Milano in the final.

== Regular season ==
	Club	Pts
1.	SG Cortina	14
2.	HC Diavoli Milano	12
3.	HC Bolzano	4
4.	HC Turin	0

== Final ==
- SG Cortina - HC Diavoli Milano 2:1 (1:2, 3:0, 7:5)
