= 1932–33 Serie A (ice hockey) season =

Italian professional ice hockey season

The 1932–33 Serie A season was the seventh season of the Serie A, the top level of ice hockey in Italy. Hockey Club Milano won the championship by defeating SG Cortina in the final.

== Qualification ==
=== Western Group ===
==== Semifinals ====
- Hockey Club Milano II - Valentino Torino 11-0
- Hockey Club Milano - Excelsior Milano 12-1

==== Final ====
Hockey Club Milano proceeded to the final-qualification, as they would've played their against their second team in the Western final.

=== Eastern Group ===
- Oritsei - HC Bolzano 0-5

== Final-Qualification ==
- Hockey Club Milano - HC Bolzano 11:0

== Final ==
- Hockey Club Milano - SG Cortina (3-0, 5-0)
