= Frank Nigro =

Canadian ice hockey player (born 1960)

- Born: February 11, 1960 (age 66) Richmond Hill, Ontario, Canada
- Height: 5 ft 9 in (175 cm)
- Weight: 182 lb (83 kg; 13 st 0 lb)
- Position: Centre
- Shot: Right
- Played for: Toronto Maple Leafs; HC Gherdëina; HC Merano; HC Varese; HC Bolzano
- National team: Italy
- NHL draft: 93rd overall, 1979; Toronto Maple Leafs
- Playing career: 1980–1992

Frank Nigro (born February 11, 1960) is a Canadian-born Italian former professional ice hockey player.

== Career ==
He played 68 games in the National Hockey League with the Toronto Maple Leafs between 1982 and 1984. In the latter stages of his playing career, he joined Merano and later HC Varese of Italy's Serie A hockey league. He also competed in the men's tournament at the 1992 Winter Olympics for Italy. As a youth, he played in the 1973 Quebec International Pee-Wee Hockey Tournament with a minor ice hockey team from Richmond Hill.

== Career statistics ==
=== Regular season and playoffs ===
			Regular season					Playoffs
Season	Team	League	GP	G	A	Pts	PIM	GP	G	A	Pts	PIM
1976–77	Richmond Hill Rams	OPJAHL	40	31	35	66	22	—	—	—	—	—
1976–77	Peterborough Petes	OMJHL	4	0	1	1	2	—	—	—	—	—
1977–78	London Knights	OMJHL	68	35	52	87	37	11	7	0	7	6
1978–79	London Knights	OMJHL	63	33	56	89	64	6	0	1	1	0
1979–80	London Knights	OMJHL	46	12	26	38	30	5	0	0	0	0
1980–81	New Brunswick Hawks	AHL	1	0	0	0	0	—	—	—	—	—
1981–82	Cincinnati Tigers	CHL	49	24	26	50	24	4	1	3	4	2
1982–83	Toronto Maple Leafs	NHL	51	6	15	21	23	3	0	0	0	2
1982–83	St. Catharines Saints	AHL	30	20	13	33	8	—	—	—	—	—
1983–84	Toronto Maple Leafs	NHL	17	2	3	5	16	—	—	—	—	—
1983–84	St. Catharines Saints	AHL	41	17	24	41	16	7	0	6	6	9
1984–85	HC Gherdëina	ITA	26	37	43	80	16	4	7	7	14	6
1985–86	HC Merano	ITA	34	68	64	132	6	6	7	9	16	0
1986–87	HC Merano	ITA	33	36	51	87	14	—	—	—	—	—
1987–88	HC Merano	ITA	35	36	36	72	30	8	12	5	17	2
1988–89	HC Varese	ITA	43	39	52	91	12	—	—	—	—	—
1989–90	HC Varese	ITA	33	21	50	71	10	6	5	5	10	0
1990–91	HC Varese	ITA	35	39	45	84	7	10	12	12	24	0
1991–92	HC Bolzano	ITA	18	5	22	27	—	7	8	10	18	8
ITA totals			257	281	363	644	95	41	51	48	99	16
NHL totals			68	8	18	26	39	3	0	0	0	2

=== International ===
Year	Team	Event	GP	G	A	Pts	PIM
1989	Italy	WC-B	7	2	8	10	14
1990	Italy	WC-B	7	4	8	12	2
1991	Italy	WC-B	7	5	3	8	0
1992	Italy	OLY	7	0	3	3	6
Senior totals			28	11	22	33	22
