= 1935–36 Serie A (ice hockey) season =

Italian professional ice hockey season

The 1935–36 Serie A season was the 10th season of the Serie A, the top level of ice hockey in Italy. Two teams participated in the league, and HC Diavoli Rossoneri Milano won the championship by defeating Hockey Club Milano in the final.

== Final ==
- HC Diavoli Rossoneri Milano - Hockey Club Milano 1:0
