= 1924–25 Serie A (ice hockey) season =

Italian professional ice hockey season

The 1924–25 Serie A season was the first season of the Serie A, the top level of ice hockey in Italy. Two teams participated in the league, and Hockey Club Milano won the championship by defeating GSD Cortina in the final.

== Final ==
- Hockey Club Milano - GSD Cortina 9:0
  (Goals: Decio Trovati 3, Guido Botturi 3, Luigi Redaelli 2, Miletto Sancassani)
