= Wayne Bianchin =

Canadian-Italian ice hockey player (born 1953)

- Born: September 6, 1953 (age 71); Nanaimo, British Columbia, Canada
- Height: 5 ft 10 in (178 cm)
- Weight: 180 lb (82 kg; 12 st 12 lb)
- Position: Left wing
- Shot: Left
- Played for: Pittsburgh Penguins; Edmonton Oilers
- National team: Italy
- NHL draft: 23rd overall, 1973; Pittsburgh Penguins
- Playing career: 1973–1982

Wayne Richard Bianchin (born September 6, 1953) is a Canadian-born Italian former professional ice hockey Left winger. He played in the National Hockey League for the Pittsburgh Penguins and Edmonton Oilers between 1973 and 1980. Internationally Bianchin played for the Italian national team at the 1981 World Championship B Pool.

== Career ==
After scoring 60 goals in 68 games with the WCJHL's Flin Flon Bombers in 1972–73, Bianchin was selected 23rd overall by the Pittsburgh Penguins at the 1973 NHL Amateur Draft. He recorded 25 points his rookie year, but suffered a broken neck while body surfing during the offseason. He spent the next season split between the AHL and NHL while recovering. He suffered his 2nd back surgery and was left unprotected on the NHL Intra League Draft. His best season came in 1976-77 when he played 79 games for the Penguins and scored 28 goals; he also appeared in the playoffs for the only time of his career. The Edmonton Oilers acquired Bianchin in the 1979 NHL Expansion Draft but he would serve just eleven games with them due to a nagging back. He chose to play a reduced schedule and played two seasons in Italy with HC Asiago and AS Mastini Varese. He was a member of the Italian national team at the Group B World Championships in 1981 and lead the tournament with scoring and was selected to the First Line All-Star Team.

== Family ==
His son, Jordan Bianchin, played professional hockey for three seasons in the Central Hockey League and in Italy's Serie A.

== Career statistics ==
=== Regular season and playoffs ===
			Regular season					Playoffs
Season	Team	League	GP	G	A	Pts	PIM	GP	G	A	Pts	PIM
1971–72	Flin Flon Bombers	WCHL	56	20	23	43	72	—	—	—	—	—
1972–73	Flin Flon Bombers	WCHL	68	60	54	114	90	—	—	—	—	—
1973–74	Hershey Bears	AHL	4	1	2	3	2	—	—	—	—	—
1973–74	Pittsburgh Penguins	NHL	69	12	13	25	38	—	—	—	—	—
1974–75	Johnstown Jets	NAHL	8	8	2	10	4	—	—	—	—	—
1974–75	Hershey Bears	AHL	3	0	1	1	0	—	—	—	—	—
1974–75	Syracuse Eagles	AHL	12	5	4	9	26	—	—	—	—	—
1974–75	Pittsburgh Penguins	NHL	1	0	0	0	0	—	—	—	—	—
1975–76	Hershey Bears	AHL	54	24	22	46	17	6	1	3	4	4
1975–76	Pittsburgh Penguins	NHL	14	1	5	6	4	—	—	—	—	—
1976–77	Pittsburgh Penguins	NHL	79	28	6	34	28	3	0	1	1	6
1977–78	Pittsburgh Penguins	NHL	61	20	13	33	40	—	—	—	—	—
1978–79	Pittsburgh Penguins	NHL	40	7	4	11	20	—	—	—	—	—
1979–80	Edmonton Oilers	NHL	11	0	0	0	7	—	—	—	—	—
1979–80	Houston Apollos	CHL	57	20	19	39	20	6	2	5	7	4
1980–81	HC Asiago	ITA	28	34	24	58	29	14	6	9	15	6
1981–82	AS Mastini Varese	ITA	20	13	14	27	—	—	—	—	—	—
NHL totals			275	68	41	109	137	3	0	1	1	6

=== International ===
Year	Team	Event	GP	G	A	Pts	PIM
1981	Italy	WC-B	7	3	9	12	2
Senior totals			7	3	9	12	2

== Awards and achievements ==
- WEC-B All-Star Team (1981)
