= 1934–35 Serie A (ice hockey) season =

Italian professional ice hockey season

The 1934–35 Serie A season was the ninth season of the Serie A, the top level of ice hockey in Italy. Three teams participated in the league, and HC Diavoli Rossoneri Milano won the championship.

== Regular season ==
=== Group A ===
	Club	GP	W	T	L	GF–GA	Pts
1.	HC Diavoli Rossoneri Milano	2	2	0	0	4:1	4
2.	Hockey Club Milano I	2	1	0	1	12:2	2
3.	Hockey Club Milano II	2	0	0	2	0:13	0
