= Bill Cupolo =

Canadian ice hockey player

- Born: January 8, 1924 Niagara Falls, Ontario, Canada
- Died: December 7, 2005 (aged 81) Niagara Falls, Ontario, Canada
- Height: 5 ft 8 in (173 cm)
- Weight: 165 lb (75 kg; 11 st 11 lb)
- Position: Right wing
- Shot: Right
- Played for: Boston Bruins
- Playing career: 1944–1955

William Arnold Cupolo (January 8, 1924 – December 7, 2005) was a Canadian ice hockey right winger. He played 47 games in the National Hockey League for the Boston Bruins during the 1944–45 season. The rest of his career, which lasted from 1944 to 1955, was spent in various minor leagues.

== Playing career ==
Cupolo was born in Niagara Falls, Ontario. He began his career at Memorial School and graduated to play minor hockey in the Falls.

In 1941, he was recruited by Stratford, where he won the Junior B title in 1941-42. The following season the team moved up to Major Junior "A" and became known as the Stratford Kroehlers.

The Boston Bruins invited him to their camp in 1943. Cupolo went to enlist in the armed forces but was diagnosed with tuberculosis and faced a 14-month recovery.

In 1944, he again went to the Bruins training camp, but this time made the team. He had 24 points in 47 games in the 1944-45 season.

After playing in the American Hockey League from 1945 to 1949, Cupolo played he played in the United States and Pacific Coast Leagues, and later Senior "A" hockey in Ontario, before moving on to Italy where he was a player-coach for Milan, and also coached the Italian National Hockey Team.

He returned to Niagara Falls after his hockey career and resided there until he died in 2005.

== Career statistics ==
=== Regular season and playoffs ===
| | | | Regular season | | | | | Playoffs |
| Season | Team | League | GP | G | A | Pts | PIM | GP | G | A | Pts | PIM |
|---|---|---|---|---|---|---|---|---|---|---|---|---|
| 1942–43 | Stratford Kroehlers | OHA | 16 | 14 | 22 | 36 | 6 | 2 | 3 | 3 | 6 | 0 |
| 1942–43 | Stratford Kroelhers | M-Cup | — | — | — | — | — | 9 | 1 | 8 | 9 | 14 |
| 1943–44 | Stratford Kroehlers | OHA | — | — | — | — | — | — | — | — | — | — |
| 1944–45 | Boston Bruins | NHL | 47 | 11 | 13 | 24 | 10 | 7 | 1 | 2 | 3 | 0 |
| 1945–46 | Hershey Bears | AHL | 25 | 4 | 9 | 13 | 21 | — | — | — | — | — |
| 1945–46 | New Haven Eagles | AHL | 17 | 4 | 5 | 9 | 4 | — | — | — | — | — |
| 1946–47 | Springfield Indians | AHL | 50 | 8 | 12 | 20 | 38 | 2 | 0 | 0 | 0 | 2 |
| 1947–48 | Springfield Indians | AHL | 17 | 1 | 4 | 5 | 2 | — | — | — | — | — |
| 1948–49 | Fort Worth Rangers | USHL | 50 | 12 | 20 | 32 | 32 | 2 | 1 | 0 | 1 | 0 |
| 1949–50 | Seattle Ironmen | PCHL | 70 | 25 | 20 | 45 | 26 | 4 | 0 | 2 | 2 | 0 |
| 1950–51 | Sydney Millionaires | CBMHL | 49 | 20 | 28 | 48 | 54 | — | — | — | — | — |
| 1951–52 | Sydney Millionaires | MMHL | 41 | 12 | 19 | 31 | 42 | — | — | — | — | — |
| 1951–52 | New Haven Tomahawks | EAHL | 29 | 19 | 10 | 29 | 25 | 9 | 3 | 2 | 5 | 2 |
| 1952–53 | Washington Lions | EAHL | 13 | 4 | 2 | 6 | 12 | — | — | — | — | — |
| 1952–53 | Kitchener-Waterloo Dutchmen | OHA Sr | 41 | 12 | 16 | 28 | 36 | — | — | — | — | — |
| 1953–54 | Stratford Indians | OHA Sr | 54 | 9 | 27 | 36 | 47 | 7 | 1 | 4 | 5 | 4 |
| 1954–55 | HC Milan Inter | ITA | — | — | — | — | — | — | — | — | — | — |
| AHL totals | | | 109 | 17 | 30 | 47 | 65 | 2 | 0 | 0 | 0 | 2 |
| NHL totals | | | 47 | 11 | 13 | 24 | 10 | 7 | 1 | 2 | 3 | 0 |
