= 1970–71 Serie A (ice hockey) season =

Italian professional ice hockey season

The 1970–71 Serie A season was the 37th season of the Serie A, the top level of ice hockey in Italy. Six teams participated in the league, and SG Cortina won the championship.

== Regular season ==
	Club	Pts
1.	SG Cortina	20
2.	HC Gherdëina	14
3.	HC Alleghe	11
4.	HC Bolzano	8
5.	Auronzo	4
6.	Asiago Hockey	3
