= 1940–41 Serie A (ice hockey) season =

Italian professional ice hockey season

The 1940–41 Serie A season was the 13th season of the Serie A, the top level of ice hockey in Italy. Four teams participated in the championship, which was won by AMDG Milano.

== Qualification ==
- AMDG Milano II - AMDG Milano III 5:1
- AMDG Milano II - Juventus Torino 6:2

== Final ==
- AMDG Milano - AMDG Milano II 20:0
