= Tony Currie (ice hockey) =

Canadian ice hockey player (born 1957)

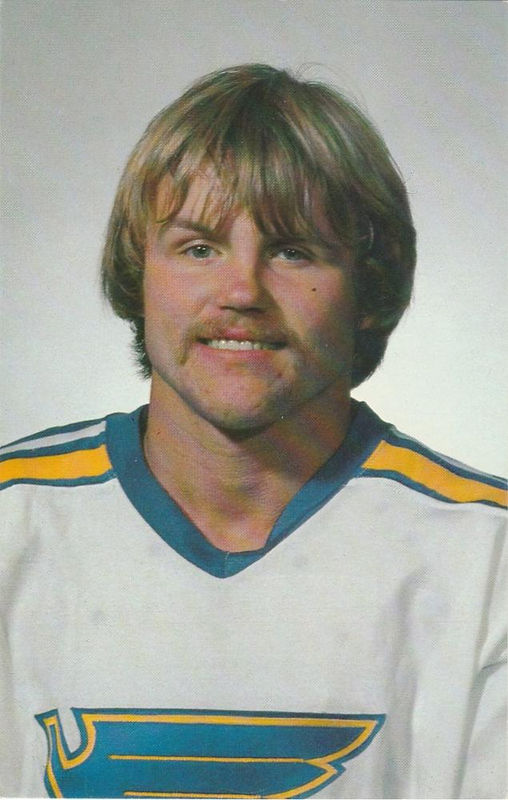
- Currie in 1978 postcard
- Born: November 12, 1957 (age 68) Sydney Mines, Nova Scotia, Canada
- Height: 5 ft 11 in (180 cm)
- Weight: 170 lb (77 kg; 12 st 2 lb)
- Position: Right Wing
- Shot: Right
- Played for: St. Louis Blues; Vancouver Canucks; Hartford Whalers
- NHL draft: 63rd overall, 1977; St. Louis Blues
- Playing career: 1977–1990

Anthony Currie (born November 12, 1957) is a Canadian former ice hockey forward who spent eight seasons in the National Hockey League between 1977 and 1985 with the St. Louis Blues, Vancouver Canucks, and Hartford Whalers. Currie also spent several years in the minor leagues, and the last several years of his career were spent in Europe, where he played in Germany, Switzerland, and Italy, retiring in 1990.

== Early life ==
Currie was born in Sydney Mines. As a youth, he played in the 1970 Quebec International Pee-Wee Hockey Tournament with a minor ice hockey team from Oromocto.

== Career ==
Currie was a selected 63rd overall in the 1977 NHL amateur draft by the St. Louis Blues following a 73-goal season for the Portland Winter Hawks of the WHL. He played 22 games for the Blues in 1977–78. During the 1979–80 season, he posting 19 goals in 40 games once called up to St. Louis. In 1980–81, he recorded 55 points in 61 games, helping the Blues to a second place overall finish in the regular season. In the playoffs, he recorded 16 points and a then-franchise record 12 assists in 11 games.

However, Currie struggled throughout his career to maintain a consistent roster spot as coaches felt his poor defensive game and lack of size and physical play overshadowed his ability to create offense. He continued to produce well in 1981–82, notching 40 points in 48 games, before being dealt to the Vancouver Canucks at the trade deadline. He added 5 more goals for Vancouver to finish with 23 in just 60 games to match his career high from the previous season, but appeared in only three games in the playoffs as Vancouver went on a surprising run to the Stanley Cup Finals.

Not a favourite of defensive-minded Canuck coach Roger Neilson, and despite his high level of production to that point of his career, Currie found himself back in the minors for most of the next two seasons, appearing in only 26 more games for the team. Released by Vancouver mid-way through the 1983–84 season, Currie signed with the Hartford Whalers. He posted 14 goals and 28 points in just 32 games for the Whalers. Despite posting 11 points in 13 games to start the 1984–85 campaign, he was waived by the Whalers. He spent two more seasons in the minors before moving to Europe and retiring in 1990.

Currie finished his NHL career with totals of 92 goals and 119 assists for 211 points in 290 NHL games, along with 73 penalty minutes.

== Personal life ==
Currie has two sons.

== Career statistics ==
=== Regular season and playoffs ===
			Regular season					Playoffs
Season	Team	League	GP	G	A	Pts	PIM	GP	G	A	Pts	PIM
1972–73	Penticton Broncos	BCJHL	—	—	—	—	—	—	—	—	—	—
1973–74	Edmonton Oil Kings	WCHL	22	0	1	1	2	—	—	—	—	—
1973–74	Spruce Grove Mets	AJHL	29	20	16	36	35	—	—	—	—	—
1974–75	Edmonton Oil Kings	WCHL	39	28	17	45	12	—	—	—	—	—
1974–75	Spruce Grove Mets	AJHL	39	36	44	80	73	—	—	—	—	—
1975–76	Edmonton Oil Kings	WCHL	71	41	40	81	56	—	—	—	—	—
1976–77	Portland Winter Hawks	WCHL	72	73	52	125	50	10	4	7	11	14
1977–78	St. Louis Blues	NHL	22	4	5	9	4	—	—	—	—	—
1977–78	Salt Lake Golden Eagles	CHL	53	33	17	50	17	—	—	—	—	—
1978–79	St. Louis Blues	NHL	36	4	15	19	0	—	—	—	—	—
1978–79	Salt Lake Golden Eagles	CHL	28	22	12	34	6	—	—	—	—	—
1979–80	St. Louis Blues	NHL	40	19	14	33	4	2	0	0	0	0
1979–80	Salt Lake Golden Eagles	CHL	33	24	23	47	17	—	—	—	—	—
1980–81	St. Louis Blues	NHL	61	23	32	55	38	11	4	12	16	4
1981–82	St. Louis Blues	NHL	48	18	22	40	17	—	—	—	—	—
1981–82	Vancouver Canucks	NHL	12	5	3	8	2	3	0	0	0	10
1982–83	Vancouver Canucks	NHL	8	1	1	2	0	—	—	—	—	—
1982–83	Fredericton Express	AHL	68	47	48	95	16	12	5	7	12	6
1983–84	Vancouver Canucks	NHL	18	3	3	6	2	—	—	—	—	—
1983–84	Fredericton Express	AHL	12	6	11	17	16	—	—	—	—	—
1983–84	Hartford Whalers	NHL	32	12	16	28	4	—	—	—	—	—
1984–85	Hartford Whalers	NHL	13	3	8	11	2	—	—	—	—	—
1984–85	Nova Scotia Oilers	AHL	53	16	31	47	8	6	1	3	4	0
1985–86	Fredericton Express	AHL	75	35	40	75	23	6	5	2	7	4
1986–87	Schwenninger ERC	GER	37	28	32	60	86	—	—	—	—	—
1986–87	EHC Kloten	NLA	3	4	3	7	2	8	6	2	8	4
1987–88	Schwenninger ERC	GER	40	19	44	63	65	—	—	—	—	—
1988–89	AS Varese	ITA	49	39	44	83	36	—	—	—	—	—
1989–90	AS Varese	ITA	33	24	31	55	17	6	1	6	7	4
NHL totals			290	92	119	211	73	16	4	12	16	14
