= 1937–38 Serie A (ice hockey) season =

Italian professional ice hockey season

The 1937–38 Serie A season was the 12th season of the Serie A, the top level of ice hockey in Italy. AMDG Milano won the championship by defeating their second team AMDG Milano II in the final.

== Final ==
- AMDG Milano - AMDG Milano II 5:3
