= 1959–60 Serie A (ice hockey) season =

Italian professional ice hockey season

The 1959–60 Serie A season was the 26th season of the Serie A, the top level of ice hockey in Italy. Four teams participated in the league, and HC Diavoli Milano won the championship.

== Regular season ==
	Club	Pts
1.	HC Diavoli Milano	17
2.	HC Bolzano	16
3.	SG Cortina	15
4.	Auronzo	0
