= Milan-Inter HC =

Italian ice hockey team

- City: Milan, Italy
- League: Serie A
- Founded: 1956
- Colours: Red, black, blue

Franchise history
- 1956-1958: Milan-Inter HC

Milan-Inter HC was an ice hockey team in Milan, Italy. The club was formed in 1956 by the merger of Hockey Club Milano Inter and HC Diavoli Rossoneri Milano.

They competed in the Serie A in the 1956-57 and 1957-58 seasons, winning the championship in 1958. The club became Diavoli HC Milano in 1958.

== Achievements ==
- Serie A champion (1): 1958.
