= Jim Koleff =

Canadian ice hockey player and coach

- Born: July 25, 1953 Hamilton, Ontario, Canada
- Died: November 2, 2008 (aged 55) Lausanne, Switzerland
- Height: 5 ft 11 in (180 cm)
- Weight: 174 lb (79 kg; 12 st 6 lb)
- Position: Right wing
- Shot: Right
- Played for: Dallas Black Hawks; Flint Generals; HC Gherdëina; HC Lugano; EHC Olten; EHC Basel; SC Aarau; Genève-Servette HC; EHC Bülach
- NHL draft: 125th overall, 1973; Chicago Black Hawks
- Playing career: 1973–1991

James Arthur Christopher Koleff (July 14, 1953 – November 2, 2008) was a Canadian hockey player and coach who spent three decades playing hockey and coaching and managing hockey teams in Europe.

Koleff played for three seasons, from 1971 to 1973, with the junior hockey Hamilton Red Wings. He was drafted by the Chicago Blackhawks in 1973, but never played in the National Hockey League. He followed with four seasons at mid-level minor hockey teams, including the Flint Generals of the International Hockey League.

Dave Chambers, just hired as coach of the HC Gherdëina of the Serie A Italian hockey league, invited Koleff to play for the team, and Koleff led the league in scoring that season. He was signed by Hockey Club Lugano of the Swiss National League A. He played for HC Lugano until 1992 when he took up the head coaching position for EV Zug.

During the 1992 season, he was diagnosed with testicular cancer, which was in remission for a period until it metastasized two years later into a stomach tumor. With chemotherapy, the cancer went into remission. He returned to coaching and led EV Zug to its first-ever league championship series. He returned to coach Lugano to a victory in the 1999 Swiss championship, the team's first win in nine seasons. He later became coach, and then general manager, of the Lausanne Hockey Club, and was a member of the team's board of directors at the time of his death. In 2006, he told The Hamilton Spectator that "I told Dave I'd go for one year and 30 years later I'm still here".

He was an assistant coach on Pat Quinn's Team Canada staff that won the silver medal at the 2006 Spengler Cup held in Davos, Switzerland.

Koleff died at age 55 on November 2, 2008 in Lausanne, Switzerland after suffering from cancer for 16 years.
