= Paolo Della Bella =

Swiss ice hockey player (born 1977)

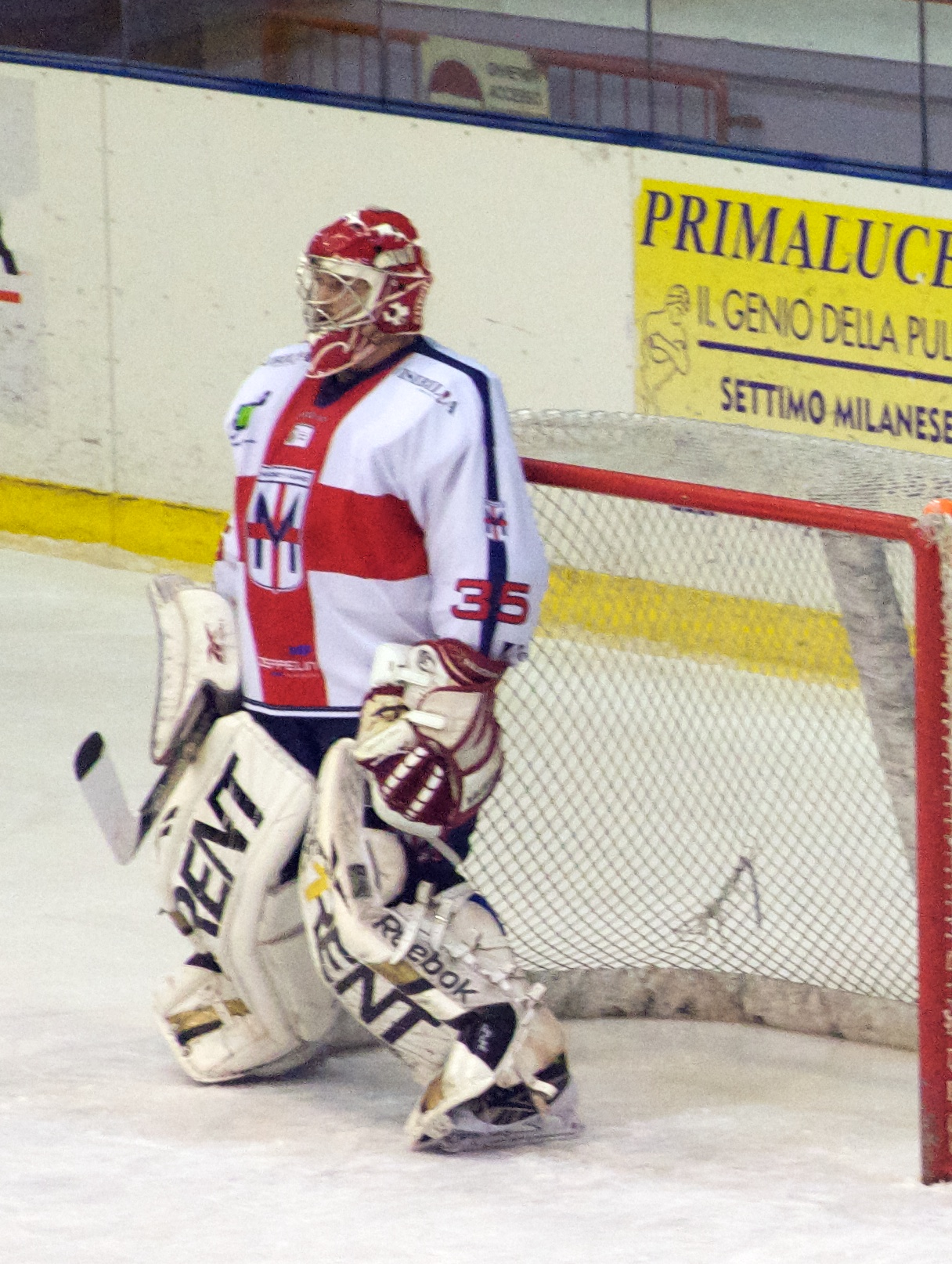
- Paolo Della Bella
- Born: September 12, 1977 (age 48) Sorengo, SUI
- Height: 5 ft 10 in (178 cm)
- Weight: 190 lb (86 kg; 13 st 8 lb)
- Position: Goaltender
- Caught: Left
- Serie A team Former teams: HC Vipers Junior Milano; HC Varese
- Playing career: 1995–2014

Paolo Gerolamo Della Bella (born September 12, 1977) is a Swiss former professional ice hockey goaltender.

== Career ==
Born in Sorengo, Switzerland, Della Bella played for the Swiss national team in four European and Junior Championships (1994–1997), and was elected the team's best player in 1994, 1995 and 1996. He has also played in approximately 100 national team exhibition games for Switzerland (junior and senior teams).

He graduated from the University of Ottawa in 2001 with a bachelor's degree in Business Administration. While a member of the hockey team in the University of Ottawa, he was voted the team's most valuable player in 1998-99 and was named to the OUA all-star team.

Della Bella was the first Western European to ever play in the Russian Super League, playing for Metallurg Magnitogorsk. During his career he has played in Switzerland (for HC Ambri-Piotta, HC Davos and HC Lugano in Nationalliga A and for HC Ajoie and HC La Chaux-de-Fonds in Nationalliga B), Canada (at the University of Ottawa), USA (for the Knoxville Ice Bears of the ACHL and for the Cincinnati Mighty Ducks of the AHL), as he was the first player ever to be called up from the ACHL (now SPHL) to the AHL, and Italy (HC Varese and HC Vipers Junior Milano). Currently he plays for the MIlano ROssoblu in the Italian Hockey League, where, in his first season, he was elected MVP of the team.

Della Bella was successful in many of the teams he played for in Europe. He helped Ambri-Piotta to their first Swiss junior championship in 1995, and was the first Western European to win the Russian championship with Magnitogorsk in 2000-2001. He won the European Cup with them in the same year and in 2005-2006 he won his first Italian championship with Milan.
