= Basler Cup =

Ice hockey tournament

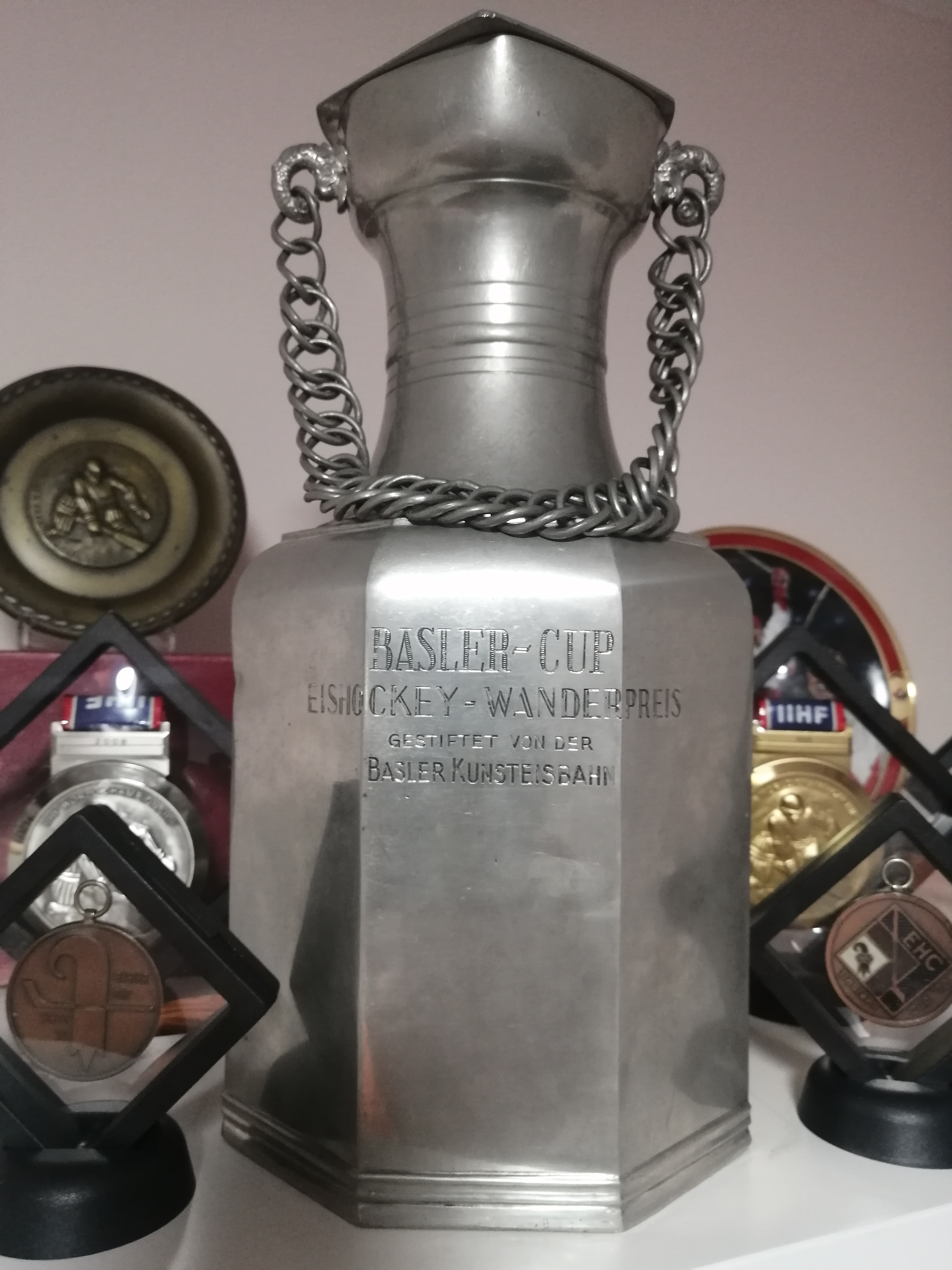
Basler Cup
- Most recent season or competition: 1965 Basler Cup
- Sport: Ice Hockey
- Founded: 1950
- No. of teams: 4 (group stage)
- Countries: Switzerland (usually EHC Basel), Norway, Germany, Sweden, Austria, Italia, France, Canada
- Venues: (Basel, Switzerland)
- Most recent champion: (Canada) RCAF Zweibrucken SC (1st title)
- Most titles: (West Germany) Riessersee SC (3), (Switzerland) EHC Basel (3)
- Qualification: Invitation only

Basler Cup (French: "Coupe de Bale") was an international ice hockey tournament for professional men's teams, which was played in Basel, Switzerland between 1950 and 1965. It was originally played in November. The tournament was traditionally attended by the local team EHC Basel. The rest of the clubs were invited by the organizers.

== History ==
The history of Basler Cup dates back to the 1930s. The best teams from the highest division of the Swiss ice hockey championship took part in the cup only. In 1950, the tournament became international. First international Basler Cup took place on 17–20 November 1950 year. The first winner of international trophy was the Diavoli Rossoneri Milano (Italy), who won the Lausanne HC (Switzerland) final. Interestingly, just a month later, first International Basler Cup winner Diavoli Rossoneri Milano won their third Spengler Cup.

== International Basler Cup winners ==
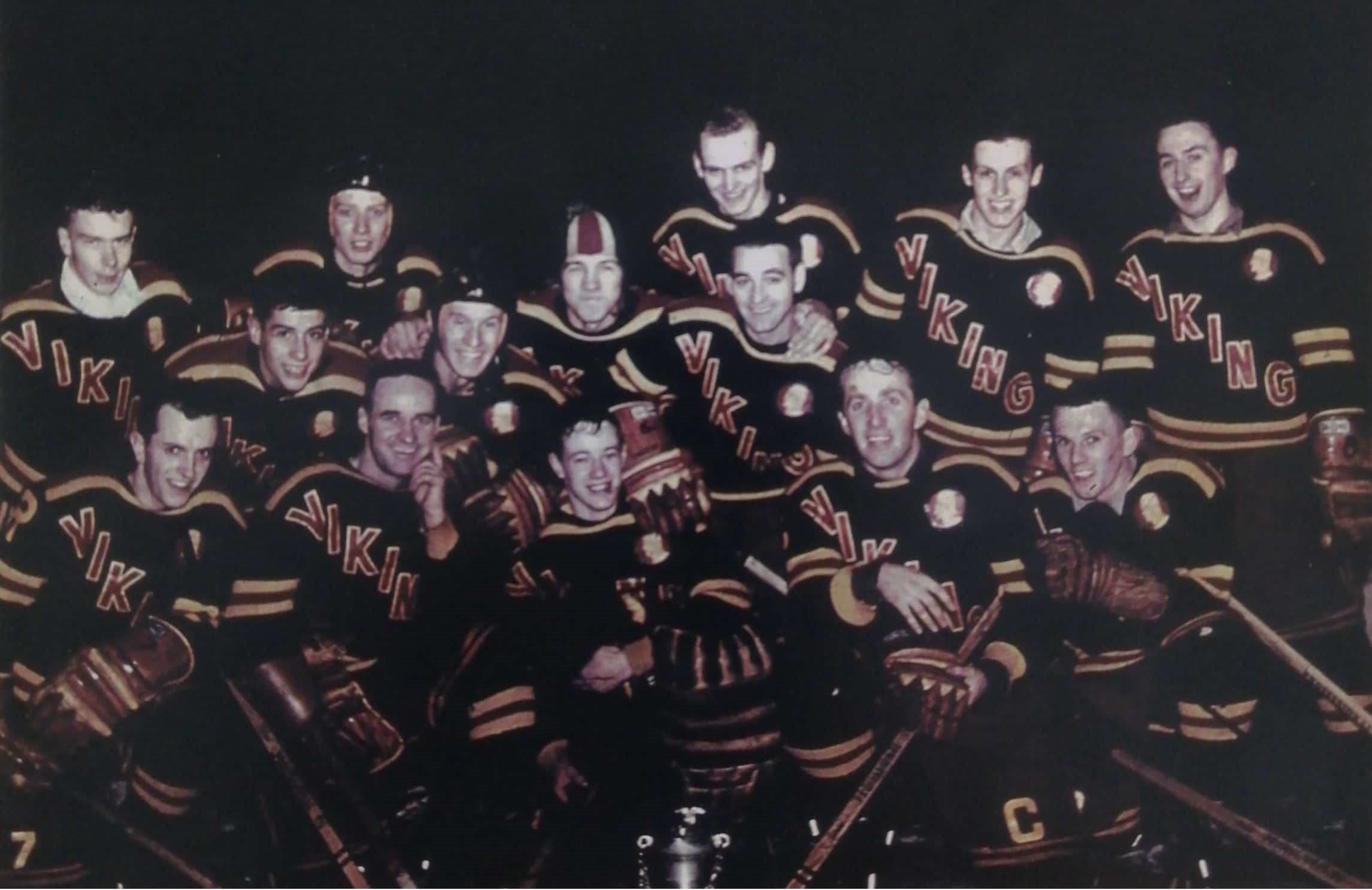
Winners in 1959 "Viking Hagfors" with Basler Cup

| Year | Place(s) | 1 | 2 | 3 | Sources |
|---|---|---|---|---|---|
| 1950 | Basel | (Italy) Diavoli Rossoneri Milano | (Switzerland) Lausanne HC | (Switzerland) EHC Basel | |
| 1951 | Basel | (Switzerland) EHC Basel | (West Germany) Riessersee SC | (Switzerland) EHC Arosa | |
| 1952 | Basel | (Switzerland) EHC Basel | (Switzerland) Lausanne HC | (West Germany) Riessersee SC | |
| 1953 | Basel | (Switzerland) Grasshopper Club Zürich | (Switzerland) EHC Basel | (Switzerland) HC Ambri-Piotta | |
| 1954 | Basel | (West Germany) Riessersee SC | (Switzerland) EHC Basel | (Switzerland) Grasshopper Club Zürich | |
| 1955 | Basel | (West Germany) Riessersee SC | (Switzerland) EHC Basel | (Switzerland) Lausanne HC | |
| 1956 | Basel | (West Germany) Riessersee SC | (Switzerland) EHC Basel | (Sweden) AIK | |
| 1957 | Basel | (Switzerland) EHC Basel | (Switzerland) Lausanne HC | (Switzerland) Geneve-Servette HC | |
| 1958 | Basel | (Italy) Cortina SG | (Norway) IK Tigrene | (Switzerland) EHC Basel | |
| 1959 | Basel | (Sweden) Viking Hagfors | (Switzerland) EHC Basel | (Switzerland) HC Ambri-Piotta | |
| 1960 | Basel | (Sweden) Sundbybergs IK | (West Germany) EHC Eintracht Francfurt | (Switzerland) EHC Basel | |
| 1961 | Basel | (Switzerland) Zürcher SC | (Italy) Cortina SG | (France) AC Boulogne-Billacourt | |
| 1962 | Basel | (Switzerland) Geneve-Servette HC | (Switzerland) EHC Basel | (Switzerland) Zürcher SC | |
| 1965 | Basel | (Canada) RCAF Zweibrucken SC | (Austria) EC Kitzbuhel | (Switzerland) EHC Basel | |

== Summer Basler Cup (2009-2011) ==
The Basel Summer Ice Hockey tournament took place for the first time from August 19 to 22, 2009. Five teams from home and abroad competed: HC Davos, HC Servette Genève, SKA Saint Petersburg, HK Dinamo Minsk and Bílí Tygři Liberec, as well as the host EHC Basel. A year later, the second event took place from August 18 to 22, 2010. In addition to the host EHC Basel Sharks, the teams HC Servette Genève, Barys Astana, HC Eaton Pardubice, defending champion SKA Saint Petersburg and the tournament winner HC Slovan Bratislava also took part. The third Basel Summer Ice Hockey Tournament took place from August 17 to 21, 2011. The six participants from five countries were SKA Saint Petersburg, Barys Astana and the hosts EHC Basel Sharks, as well as, for the first time, SC Bern, the Krefeld Pinguine and the eventual tournament winner JYP Jyväskylä. The board of directors of the EHC Basel Sharks decided in 2012 to no longer hold the Basel Summer Ice Hockey.
