= 1980–81 Serie A (ice hockey) season =

Italian professional ice hockey season

The 1980–81 Serie A season was the 47th season of the Serie A, the top level of ice hockey in Italy. Eight teams participated in the league, and HC Gherdeina won the championship.

== Regular season ==
	Club	Pts
1.	HC Gherdëina	50
2.	HC Bolzano	49
3.	HC Brunico	32
4.	SG Cortina	27
5.	HC Meran	24
6.	HC Alleghe	21
7.	Asiago Hockey	17
8.	HC Valpellice	4
