= 1985–86 Serie A (ice hockey) season =

Italian professional ice hockey season

The 1985–86 Serie A season was the 52nd season of the Serie A, the top level of ice hockey in Italy. 10 teams participated in the league, and HC Merano won the championship by defeating Asiago Hockey in the final.

== Regular season ==
	Club	GP	W	T	L	GF–GA	Pts
1.	HC Merano	36	31	1	4	307:147	63
2.	AS Varese Hockey	36	27	1	8	211:109	55
3.	HC Bolzano	36	26	3	7	261:143	55
4.	Asiago Hockey	36	23	3	10	257:184	49
5.	HC Alleghe	36	15	4	17	175:194	34
6.	HC Auronzo	36	16	0	20	204:268	32
7.	HC Brunico	36	12	0	24	127:193	24
8.	HC Gherdëina	36	10	0	26	158:247	20
9.	HC Fassa	36	7	2	27	152:298	16
10.	SG Cortina	36	5	2	29	122:191	12

== Playoffs ==
Quarterfinals
1	HC Merano
Freilos
3	HC Bolzano	2
6	HC Auronzo	0
2	AS Varese Hockey
Freilos
4	Asiago Hockey	2
5	HC Alleghe	1

Semifinals
1	HC Merano	2
3	HC Bolzano	1
2	AS Varese Hockey	0
4	Asiago Hockey	2

Finals
1	HC Merano	2
4	Asiago Hockey	1

== Play-outs ==
- HC Brunico - SG Cortina 2:1 (5:1, 1:3, 3:2)
- HC Gherdëina - HC Fassa 0:2 (4:9, 2:5)

== Relegation ==
- HC Gherdëina - SG Cortina 0:2 (8:9, 3:8)
