= Stefan Mair =

Italian ice hockey coach

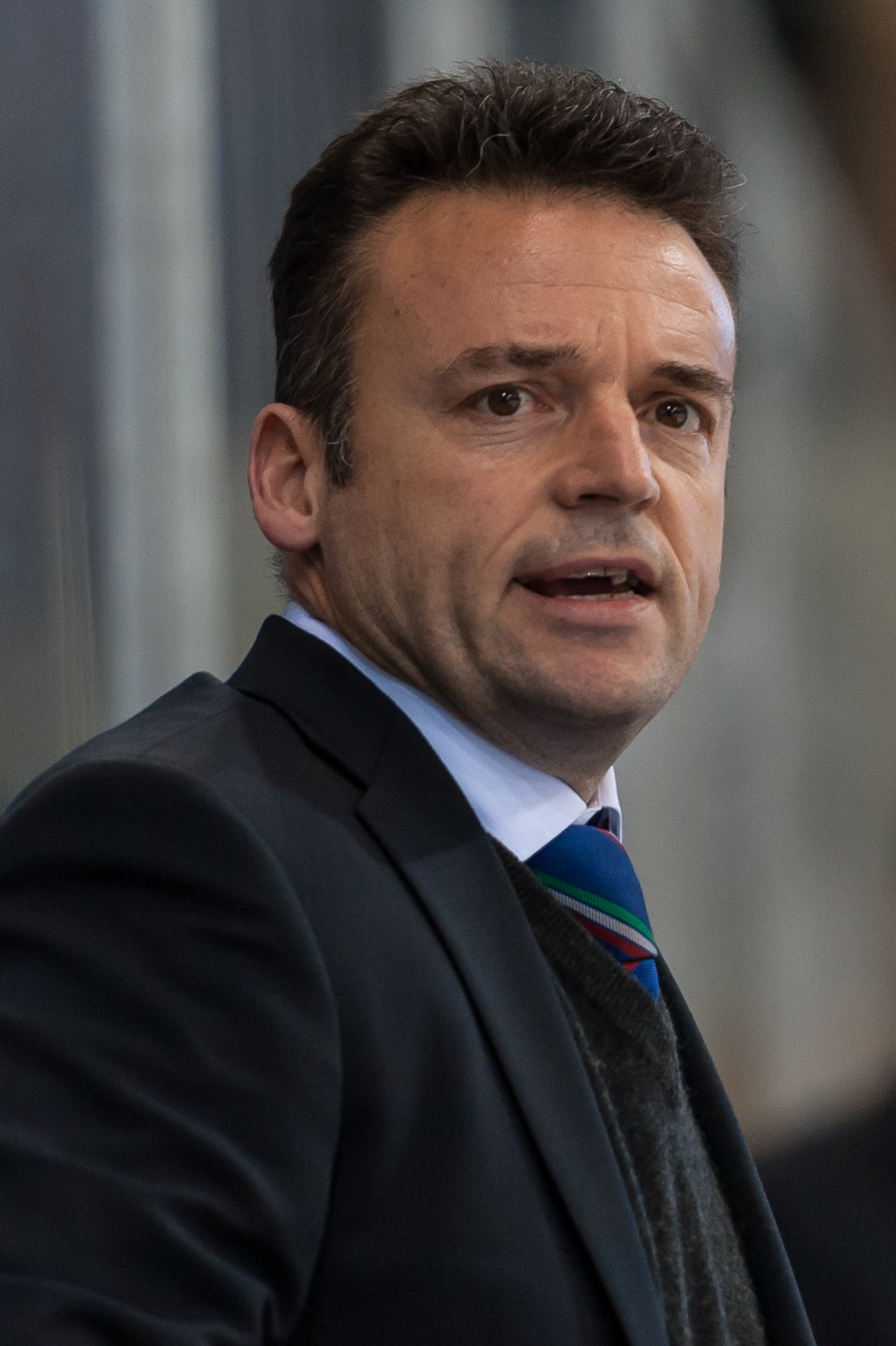
- Born: 6 June 1967 (age 58) Bolzano, Italy
- Height: 5 ft 8 in (173 cm)
- Weight: 172 lb (78 kg; 12 st 4 lb)
- Position: Forward
- Shot: Left
- Played for: HCB South Tyrol; HC Devils Milano; HC Varese; HC Pustertal Wölfe; Ritten Sport; HC Merano; WSV Sterzing Broncos; HC Eppan Pirates
- National team: Italy
- Playing career: 1988–2002

Stefan Mair (born 6 June 1967) is an Italian ice hockey coach of the Italian national team.
