= 2006–07 IIHF Continental Cup =

The Continental Cup 2006–07 was the tenth edition of the IIHF Continental Cup. The season started on September 22, 2006, and finished on January 7, 2007.

The tournament was won by Yunost Minsk, who led the final group.

The points system used in this tournament was: the winner in regular time won 3 points, the loser 0 points; in case of a tie, an overtime and a penalty shootout is played, the winner in penalty shootouts or overtime won 2 points and the loser won 1 point.

== Preliminary round ==
=== Group A ===
(Bucharest, Romania)

Team #1	Score	Team #2
HK Slavija Ljubljana (Slovenia)	9:0	(Bulgaria) Akademika Sofia
Steaua București Hockey (Romania)	12:0	(Bulgaria) Akademika Sofia
Steaua București Hockey (Romania)	5:4	(Slovenia) HK Slavija Ljubljana

=== Group A standings ===
Rank	Team	Points
1	(Romania) Steaua București Hockey	6
2	(Slovenia) HK Slavija Ljubljana	3
3	(Bulgaria) Akademika Sofia	0

=== Group B ===
(Belgrade, Serbia)

Team #1	Score	Team #2
HK Partizan (Serbia)	20:0	(Turkey) Polis Akademisi

=== Group B standings * ===
Rank	Team	Points
1	(Serbia) HK Partizan	3
2	(Turkey) Polis Akademisi	0

* : (Croatia) KHL Medveščak Zagreb was disqualified

== First Group Stage ==
=== Group C ===
(Rouen, France)

Team #1	Score	Team #2
EC Red Bull Salzburg (Austria)	4:4 (1:0 PS)	(Denmark) SønderjyskE
Dragons de Rouen (France)	6:2	(United Kingdom) Nottingham Panthers
EC Red Bull Salzburg (Austria)	5:2	(United Kingdom) Nottingham Panthers
Dragons de Rouen (France)	2:5	(Denmark) SønderjyskE
SønderjyskE (Denmark)	4:2	(United Kingdom) Nottingham Panthers
Dragons de Rouen (France)	0:6	(Austria) EC Red Bull Salzburg

=== Group C standings ===
Rank	Team	Points
1	(Austria) EC Red Bull Salzburg	8
2	(Denmark) SønderjyskE	7
3	(France) Dragons de Rouen	3
4	(United Kingdom) Nottingham Panthers	0

=== Group D ===
(Kraków, Poland)

Team #1	Score	Team #2
Cracovia (Poland)	2:4	(Kazakhstan) Kazakhmys Satpaev
Steaua București Hockey (Romania)	10:1	(Spain) Club Gel Puigcerdà
Kazakhmys Satpaev (Kazakhstan)	4:1	(Romania) Steaua București Hockey
Cracovia (Poland)	6:2	(Spain) Club Gel Puigcerdà
Kazakhmys Satpaev (Kazakhstan)	12:0	(Spain) Club Gel Puigcerdà
Cracovia (Poland)	6:2	(Romania) Steaua București Hockey

=== Group D standings ===
Rank	Team	Points
1	(Kazakhstan) Kazakhmys Satpaev	9
2	(Poland) Cracovia	6
3	(Romania) Steaua București Hockey	3
4	(Spain) Club Gel Puigcerdà	0

=== Group E ===
(Elektrėnai, Lithuania)

Team #1	Score	Team #2
Sokil Kiev (Ukraine)	11:0	(Serbia) HK Partizan
SC Energija (Lithuania)	3:8	(Latvia) HK Riga 2000
HK Riga 2000 (Latvia)	8:0	(Serbia) HK Partizan
SC Energija (Lithuania)	1:10	(Ukraine) Sokil Kiev
Sokil Kiev (Ukraine)	3:2	(Latvia) HK Riga 2000
SC Energija (Lithuania)	6:4	(Serbia) HK Partizan

=== Group E standings ===
Rank	Team	Points
1	(Ukraine) Sokil Kiev	9
2	(Latvia) HK Riga 2000	6
3	(Lithuania) SC Energija	3
4	(Serbia) HK Partizan	0

(Belarus) Yunost Minsk : bye

== Second Group Stage ==
=== Group F ===
(Minsk, Belarus)

Team #1	Score	Team #2
Kazakhmys Satpaev (Kazakhstan)	6:2	(Ukraine) Sokil Kiev
Yunost Minsk (Belarus)	1:0	(Austria) EC Red Bull Salzburg
Kazakhmys Satpaev (Kazakhstan)	7:2	(Austria) EC Red Bull Salzburg
Yunost Minsk (Belarus)	7:2	(Ukraine) Sokil Kiev
EC Red Bull Salzburg (Austria)	6:3	(Ukraine) Sokil Kiev
Yunost Minsk (Belarus)	2:1 (OT)	(Kazakhstan) Kazakhmys Satpaev

=== Group F standings ===
Rank	Team	Points
1	(Belarus) Yunost Minsk	8
2	(Kazakhstan) Kazakhmys Satpaev	7
3	(Austria) EC Red Bull Salzburg	3
4	(Ukraine) Sokil Kiev	0

(Hungary) Alba Volán Székesfehérvár, (Finland) Ilves, (Russia) Avangard Omsk : bye

== Final stage ==
=== Final Group ===
(Székesfehérvár, Hungary)

Team #1	Score	Team #2
Yunost Minsk (Belarus)	3:2	(Finland) Ilves
Alba Volán Székesfehérvár (Hungary)	2:6	(Russia) Avangard Omsk
Avangard Omsk (Russia)	4:1	(Finland) Ilves
Alba Volán Székesfehérvár (Hungary)	2:5	(Belarus) Yunost Minsk
Alba Volán Székesfehérvár (Hungary)	1:5	(Finland) Ilves
Yunost Minsk (Belarus)	0:0 (2:1 PS)	(Russia) Avangard Omsk

=== Final Group standings ===
Rank	Team	Points
1	(Belarus) Yunost Minsk	8
2	(Russia) Avangard Omsk	7
3	(Finland) Ilves	3
4	(Hungary) Alba Volán Székesfehérvár	0
