= 2005–06 IIHF Continental Cup =

The Continental Cup 2005–06 was the ninth edition of the IIHF Continental Cup. The season started on September 23, 2005, and finished on January 9, 2006.

The tournament was won by Lada Togliatti, who led the final group.

== Preliminary round ==
=== Group A ===
(Bucharest, Romania)

Team #1	Score	Team #2
KHL Medveščak Zagreb (Croatia)	5:1	(Serbia and Montenegro) KHK Crvena Zvezda
HC Steaua București (Romania)	5:2	(Croatia) KHL Medveščak Zagreb
HC Steaua București (Romania)	8:3	(Serbia and Montenegro) KHK Crvena Zvezda

=== Group A standings * ===
Rank	Team	Points
1	(Romania) HC Steaua București	4
2	(Croatia) KHL Medveščak Zagreb	2
3	(Serbia and Montenegro) KHK Crvena Zvezda	0

*: (Romania) CS Progym Gheorgheni forfeit from the tournament

=== Group B ===
(Ankara, Turkey)

Team #1	Score	Team #2
CH Jaca (Spain)	5:2	(Bulgaria) HC Slavia Sofia
Polis Akademisi (Turkey)	12:1	(Israel) Maccabi Amos Lod
CH Jaca (Spain)	13:2	(Israel) Maccabi Amos Lod
Polis Akademisi (Turkey)	5:3	(Bulgaria) HC Slavia Sofia
HC Slavia Sofia (Bulgaria)	5:0	(Israel) Maccabi Amos Lod
Polis Akademisi (Turkey)	4:7	(Spain) CH Jaca

=== Group B standings ===
Rank	Team	Points
1	(Spain) CH Jaca	6
2	(Turkey) Polis Akademisi	4
3	(Bulgaria) HC Slavia Sofia	2
4	(Israel) Maccabi Amos Lod	0

== First Group Stage ==
=== Group C ===
(Elektrėnai, Lithuania)

Team #1	Score	Team #2
HK Riga 2000 (Latvia)	7:2	(Poland) GKS Tychy
SC Energija (Lithuania)	3:4	(Romania) HC Steaua București
HK Riga 2000 (Latvia)	10:4	(Romania) HC Steaua București
SC Energija (Lithuania)	2:9	(Poland) GKS Tychy
HC Steaua București (Romania)	4:4	(Poland) GKS Tychy
SC Energija (Lithuania)	0:10	(Latvia) HK Riga 2000

=== Group C standings ===
Rank	Team	Points
1	(Latvia) HK Riga 2000	6
2	(Poland) GKS Tychy	3
3	(Romania) HC Steaua București	3
4	(Lithuania) SC Energija	0

=== Group D ===
(Grenoble, France)

Team #1	Score	Team #2
Herning Blue Fox (Denmark)	2:2	(United Kingdom) Coventry Blaze
Brûleurs de Loups Grenoble (France)	2:2	(Netherlands) Amstel Tijgers
Coventry Blaze (United Kingdom)	5:4	(Netherlands) Amstel Tijgers
Brûleurs de Loups Grenoble (France)	3:1	(Denmark) Herning Blue Fox
Herning Blue Fox (Denmark)	3:3	(Netherlands) Amstel Tijgers
Brûleurs de Loups Grenoble (France)	2:0	(United Kingdom) Coventry Blaze

=== Group D standings ===
Rank	Team	Points
1	(France) Brûleurs de Loups Grenoble	5
2	(United Kingdom) Coventry Blaze	3
3	(Netherlands) Amstel Tijgers	2
4	(Denmark) Herning Blue Fox	2

=== Group E ===
(Minsk, Belarus)

Team #1	Score	Team #2
Sokil Kiev (Ukraine)	4:0	(Spain) CH Jaca
Yunost Minsk (Belarus)	4:0	(Kazakhstan) Kazzinc-Torpedo
Kazzinc-Torpedo (Kazakhstan)	3:1	(Ukraine) Sokil Kiev
Yunost Minsk (Belarus)	8:0	(Spain) CH Jaca
Kazzinc-Torpedo (Kazakhstan)	10:0	(Spain) CH Jaca
Yunost Minsk (Belarus)	2:1	(Ukraine) Sokil Kiev

=== Group E standings ===
Rank	Team	Points
1	(Belarus) Yunost Minsk	6
2	(Kazakhstan) Kazzinc-Torpedo	4
3	(Ukraine) Sokil Kiev	2
4	(Spain) CH Jaca	0

(Slovenia) HK Acroni Jesenice : bye

== Second Group Stage ==
=== Group F ===
(Jesenice, Slovenia)

Team #1	Score	Team #2
HK Riga 2000 (Latvia)	2:1	(Belarus) Yunost Minsk
HK Acroni Jesenice (Slovenia)	6:2	(France) Brûleurs de Loups Grenoble
HK Acroni Jesenice (Slovenia)	1:2	(Belarus) Yunost Minsk
HK Riga 2000 (Latvia)	4:3	(France) Brûleurs de Loups Grenoble
Yunost Minsk (Belarus)	8:1	(France) Brûleurs de Loups Grenoble
HK Acroni Jesenice (Slovenia)	1:2	(Latvia) HK Riga 2000

=== Group F standings ===
Rank	Team	Points
1	(Latvia) HK Riga 2000	6
2	(Belarus) Yunost Minsk	4
3	(Slovenia) HK Acroni Jesenice	2
4	(France) Brûleurs de Loups Grenoble	0

(Hungary) Alba Volán Székesfehérvár, (Switzerland) ZSC Lions, (Russia) Lada Togliatti : bye

== Final stage ==
=== Final Group ===
(Székesfehérvár, Hungary)

Team #1	Score	Team #2
Lada Togliatti (Russia)	4:1	(Latvia) HK Riga 2000
Alba Volán Székesfehérvár (Hungary)	2:3	(Switzerland) ZSC Lions
HK Riga 2000 (Latvia)	5:4	(Switzerland) ZSC Lions
Alba Volán Székesfehérvár (Hungary)	3:4	(Russia) Lada Togliatti
Alba Volán Székesfehérvár (Hungary)	2:7	(Latvia) HK Riga 2000
Lada Togliatti (Russia)	1:0	(Switzerland) ZSC Lions

=== Final Group standings ===
Rank	Team	Points
1	(Russia) Lada Togliatti	6
2	(Latvia) HK Riga 2000	4
3	(Switzerland) ZSC Lions	2
4	(Hungary) Alba Volán Székesfehérvár	0
