= 1986–87 Serie A (ice hockey) season =

Italian professional ice hockey season

The 1986–87 Serie A season was the 53rd season of the Serie A, the top level of ice hockey in Italy. 10 teams participated in the league, and AS Varese Hockey won the championship by defeating HC Bozen in the final.

== First round ==
	Club	GP	W	T	L	GF–GA	Pts
1.	HC Bozen	18	12	1	5	114:72	25
2.	HC Fassa	18	11	2	5	96:80	24
3.	AS Varese Hockey	18	10	3	5	78:55	23
4.	HC Meran	18	10	0	8	88:89	20
5.	SG Cortina	18	8	2	8	75:69	18
6.	HC Alleghe	18	7	3	8	76:79	17
7.	Asiago Hockey	18	7	3	8	105:100	17
8.	EV Brunico	18	5	5	8	63:71	15
9.	SV Ritten	18	7	0	11	85:117	14
10.	HC Auronzo	18	3	1	14	67:115	7

== Second round ==
=== Group A ===
	Club	GP	W	T	L	GF–GA	Pts (Bonus)
1.	HC Bozen	10	9	0	1	65:37	23 (5)
2.	AS Varese Hockey	10	5	1	4	47:35	14 (3)
3.	HC Meran	10	5	1	4	39:46	13 (2)
4.	SG Cortina	10	4	0	6	39:40	9 (1)
5.	HC Alleghe	10	4	0	6	46:49	8 (0)
6.	HC Fassa	10	2	0	8	45:74	8 (4)

=== Group B ===
	Club	GP	W	T	L	GF–GA	Pts (Bonus)
7.	Asiago Hockey	12	7	2	3	58:45	18 (3)
8.	EV Brunico	12	6	2	4	38:32	16 (2)
9.	SV Ritten	12	5	1	6	52:54	12 (1)
10.	HC Auronzo	12	3	1	8	44:61	7 (0)

== Playoffs ==
Quarterfinals
1	HC Bozen	2
8	EV Brunico	0
4	SG Cortina	0
5	HC Alleghe	2
2	AS Varese Hockey	2
7	Asiago Hockey	0
3	HC Meran	2
6	HC Fassa	0

Semifinals
1	HC Bozen	3
5	HC Alleghe	1
2	AS Varese Hockey	3
3	HC Meran	0

Finals
1	HC Bozen	0
2	AS Varese Hockey	3
