= 1995–96 IIHF Federation Cup =

The Federation Cup 1995–96 was the second and last edition of the IIHF Federation Cup. The season started on October 6, 1995, and finished on December 29, 1995.

The tournament was won by AS Mastini Varese, who beat Metallurg Magnitogorsk in the final.

== Preliminary round ==
=== Group A * ===
==== Group A Participants ====
(Hungary) Alba Volán Székesfehérvár, (Lithuania) HK Solvita Kaunas, (Federal Republic of Yugoslavia) KHK Crvena zvezda, (Romania) SC Miercurea Ciuc

==== Group A Winner ====
(Romania) SC Miercurea Ciuc

*: Scheduled group did not take place, SC Miercurea Ciuc qualification criteria were unclear.

=== Group B ===
(Jesenice, Slovenia)

Team #1	Score	Team #2
HK Acroni Jesenice (Slovenia)	5:4	(Croatia) KHL Medveščak Zagreb

== First stage ==
=== Group C ===
(Riga, Latvia)

==== Group C Semifinals ====
Team #1	Score	Team #2
Salavat Yulaev Ufa (Russia)	12:1	(Romania) SC Miercurea Ciuc
Nik's Brih Rīga (Latvia)	2:5	(Norway) Vålerenga

==== Group C Third Place ====
Team #1	Score	Team #2
Nik's Brih Rīga (Latvia)	8:3	(Romania) SC Miercurea Ciuc

==== Group C Final ====
Team #1	Score	Team #2
Salavat Yulaev Ufa (Russia)	5:2	(Norway) Vålerenga

=== Group D ===
(Oświęcim, Poland)

==== Group B Semifinals ====
Team #1	Score	Team #2
Metallurg Magnitogorsk (Russia)	9:1	(Slovenia) HK Acroni Jesenice
KS Unia Oświęcim (Poland)	1:4	(Belarus) Polymir Novopolotsk

==== Group D Third Place ====
Team #1	Score	Team #2
KS Unia Oświęcim (Poland)	3:8	(Slovenia) HK Acroni Jesenice

==== Group D Final ====
Team #1	Score	Team #2
Metallurg Magnitogorsk (Russia)	6:1	(Belarus) Polymir Novopolotsk

=== Group E ===
(Varese, Italy)

==== Group E Semifinals ====
Team #1	Score	Team #2
ZPS Zlín (Czech Republic)	12:3	(Ukraine) HK ATEK Kiev
AS Mastini Varese (Italy)	4:1	(France) Chamonix HC

==== Group E Third Place ====
Team #1	Score	Team #2
Chamonix HC (France)	3:2	(Ukraine) HK ATEK Kiev

==== Group E Final ====
Team #1	Score	Team #2
AS Mastini Varese (Italy)	4:3	(Czech Republic) ZPS Zlín

(Slovakia) HK Dukla Trenčín : bye

== Final stage ==
(Trenčín, Slovakia)

=== Semifinals ===
Team #1	Score	Team #2
Metallurg Magnitogorsk (Russia)	2:1	(Russia) Salavat Yulaev Ufa
HK Dukla Trenčín (Slovakia)	1:2	(Italy) AS Mastini Varese

=== Third place match ===
Team #1	Score	Team #2
HK Dukla Trenčín (Slovakia)	4:7	(Russia) Salavat Yulaev Ufa

=== Final ===
Team #1	Score	Team #2
AS Mastini Varese (Italy)	4:3	(Russia) Metallurg Magnitogorsk
