= 1994–95 IIHF Federation Cup =

The Federation Cup 1994–95 was the first edition of the IIHF Federation Cup. The season started on November 11, 1994, and finished on December 29, 1994.

The tournament was won by Salavat Yulaev Ufa, who beat HC Pardubice in the final.

== First stage ==
=== Group A ===
(Oświęcim, Poland)

==== Group A Semifinals ====
Team #1	Score	Team #2
Salavat Yulaev Ufa (Russia)	21:1	(Croatia) KHL Medveščak Zagreb
KS Unia Oświęcim (Poland)	3:2	(Hungary) Alba Volán Székesfehérvár

==== Group A Third Place ====
Team #1	Score	Team #2
Alba Volán Székesfehérvár (Hungary)	13:2	(Croatia) KHL Medveščak Zagreb

==== Group A Final ====
Team #1	Score	Team #2
KS Unia Oświęcim (Poland)	2:10	(Russia) Salavat Yulaev Ufa

=== Group B ===
(Poprad, Slovakia)

==== Group B Semifinals ====
Team #1	Score	Team #2
HC Pardubice (Czech Republic)	12:2	(Ukraine) HK Polytekhnic Kiev
ŠKP Poprad (Slovakia)	20:1	(Romania) SC Miercurea Ciuc

==== Group B Third Place ====
Team #1	Score	Team #2
HK Polytekhnic Kiev (Ukraine)	6:5	(Romania) SC Miercurea Ciuc

==== Group B Final ====
Team #1	Score	Team #2
ŠKP Poprad (Slovakia)	4:5	(Czech Republic) HC Pardubice

=== Group C ===
(Belgrade, FR Yugoslavia)

==== Group C Semifinals ====
Team #1	Score	Team #2
HK Bulat Temirtau (Kazakhstan)	12:1	(Bulgaria) HC Levski Sofia
HK Partizan (Federal Republic of Yugoslavia)	5:1	(Federal Republic of Yugoslavia) HK Vojvodina

==== Group C Third Place ====
Team #1	Score	Team #2
HK Vojvodina (Federal Republic of Yugoslavia)	2:4	(Bulgaria) HC Levski Sofia

==== Group C Final ====
Team #1	Score	Team #2
HK Partizan (Federal Republic of Yugoslavia)	4:2	(Kazakhstan) HK Bulat Temirtau

(Slovenia) HDD Olimpija Ljubljana : bye

== Final stage ==
(Ljubljana, Slovenia)

=== Semifinals ===
Team #1	Score	Team #2
HC Pardubice (Czech Republic)	6:1	(Federal Republic of Yugoslavia) HK Partizan
HDD Olimpija Ljubljana (Slovenia)	1:7	(Russia) Salavat Yulaev Ufa

=== Third place match ===
Team #1	Score	Team #2
HDD Olimpija Ljubljana (Slovenia)	12:0	(Federal Republic of Yugoslavia) HK Partizan

=== Final ===
Team #1	Score	Team #2
Salavat Yulaev Ufa (Russia)	4:1	(Czech Republic) HC Pardubice
