= IIHF Continental Cup =

European ice hockey tournament

- Most recent season or competition: 2026–27 IIHF Continental Cup
- Formerly: IIHF European Cup
- Sport: Ice hockey
- Founded: 1997
- Founder: IIHF
- Most recent champions: (United Kingdom) Nottingham Panthers (2nd title)
- Most titles: (Belarus) Yunost Minsk (3 titles)
- Qualification: Champions Hockey League
- Website: iihf.com

The Continental Cup is a second-level ice hockey tournament for European clubs (behind Champions Hockey League), begun in 1997 after the discontinuing of the European Cup. It was intended for teams from countries without representatives in the European Hockey League, with participating teams chosen by the countries' respective ice hockey associations. Hans Dobida served as chairman of the Continental Cup until 2018.

== Format ==
=== IIHF Federation Cup ===
The Federation Cup was an official European ice hockey club competition created in 1995. It was the second European competition for club teams, intended for those teams who could not qualify for the European Cup, especially for those from Eastern European countries. It was the direct predecessor of the IIHF Continental Cup, which was played two seasons later.

In the first year of competition, 13 Eastern European teams from twelve countries participated in the tournament. In a KO-system with three qualifying groups, which qualifies the four participants in the finals. The following year was played in the same mode. Due to the increased number of participants (some Western European clubs had registered for the competition), an additional qualifying round was introduced.

=== IIIHF Continental Cup ===
The competition began in 1997–98 with 42 clubs from 26 countries, which expanded to 48 teams for the next two years. The tournament was played in seeded rounds of qualifying groups. There were three rounds of qualifying groups, with winners of qualifying groups progressing to the next round. The three winners of the third round groups entered the semifinals, along with the host club. The first round was held in September, the second in October, the third in November and the finals in December.

In the 2000–01 season, with the European Hockey League on hiatus, the Continental Cup became the de facto European club championship. The format remained the same, with 36 teams from 27 countries.

With the beginning of the IIHF European Champions Cup from 2004 to 2005, participants included national champions of countries not in the Super Six (the top six European nations according to the IIHF World Ranking), as well as teams from Super Six leagues, which included HC Dynamo Moscow and HKm Zvolen.

== Medalists ==
=== Federation Cup medalists ===
#	Season	Winner	Runner-up	Third place	Host
1	1994–95	(Russia) Salavat Yulaev Ufa	(Czech Republic) HC Pardubice	(Slovenia) HDD Olimpija Ljubljana	(Slovenia) Ljubljana
2	1995–96	(Italy) AS Mastini Varese	(Russia) Metallurg Magnitogorsk	(Russia) Salavat Yulaev Ufa	(Slovakia) Trenčín

=== Continental Cup medalists ===
#	Season	Winner	Runner-up	Third place	Host
1	1997–98	(Slovakia) TJ VSŽ Košice	(Germany) Eisbären Berlin	(Finland) Ilves	(Finland) Tampere
2	1998–99	(Switzerland) HC Ambrì-Piotta	(Slovakia) HC Košice	(Russia) Avangard Omsk	(Slovakia) Košice
3	1999–2000	(Switzerland) HC Ambrì-Piotta	(Germany) Eisbären Berlin	(Russia) Ak Bars Kazan	(Germany) Berlin
4	2000–01	(Switzerland) ZSC Lions	(United Kingdom) London Knights	(Slovakia) Slovan Bratislava	(Switzerland) Zürich
5	2001–02	(Switzerland) ZSC Lions	(Italy) Milano Vipers	(Slovakia) HKm Zvolen	(Switzerland) Zürich
6	2002–03	(Finland) Jokerit	(Russia) Lokomotiv Yaroslavl	(Switzerland) HC Lugano	(Switzerland) Lugano & (Italy) Milan
7	2003–04	(Slovakia) Slovan Bratislava	(Belarus) HK Gomel	(Switzerland) HC Lugano	(Belarus) Gomel
8	2004–05	(Slovakia) HKm Zvolen	(Russia) Dynamo Moscow	(Hungary) Alba Volán Székesfehérvár	(Hungary) Székesfehérvár
9	2005–06	(Russia) Lada Togliatti	(Latvia) HK Riga 2000	(Switzerland) ZSC Lions	(Hungary) Székesfehérvár
10	2006–07	(Belarus) Yunost Minsk	(Russia) Avangard Omsk	(Finland) Ilves	(Hungary) Székesfehérvár
11	2007–08	(Russia) Ak Bars Kazan	(Latvia) HK Riga 2000	(Kazakhstan) Kazzinc-Torpedo	(Latvia) Riga
12	2008–09	(Slovakia) MHC Martin	(France) Dragons de Rouen	(Italy) HC Bolzano	(France) Rouen
13	2009–10	(Austria) Red Bull Salzburg	(Belarus) Yunost Minsk	(United Kingdom) Sheffield Steelers	(France) Grenoble
14	2010–11	(Belarus) Yunost Minsk	(Austria) Red Bull Salzburg	(Denmark) SønderjyskE Ishockey	(Belarus) Minsk
15	2011–12	(France) Dragons de Rouen	(Belarus) Yunost Minsk	(Ukraine) HC Donbass	(France) Rouen
16	2012–13	(Ukraine) HC Donbass	(Belarus) Metallurg Zhlobin	(France) Dragons de Rouen	(Ukraine) Donetsk
17	2013–14	(Norway) Stavanger Oilers	(Ukraine) HC Donbass	(Italy) HC Asiago	(France) Rouen
18	2014–15	(Belarus) Neman Grodno	(Germany) Fischtown Pinguins	(France) Ducs d'Angers	(Germany) Bremerhaven
19	2015–16	(France) Dragons de Rouen	(Denmark) Herning Blue Fox	(Poland) GKS Tychy	(France) Rouen
20	2016–17	(United Kingdom) Nottingham Panthers	(Kazakhstan) Beibarys Atyrau	(Denmark) Odense Bulldogs	(Italy) Ritten
21	2017–18	(Belarus) Yunost Minsk	(Kazakhstan) Nomad Astana	(United Kingdom) Sheffield Steelers	(Belarus) Minsk
22	2018–19	(Kazakhstan) Arlan Kokshetau	(United Kingdom) Belfast Giants	(Poland) GKS Katowice	(United Kingdom) Belfast
23	2019–20	(Denmark) SønderjyskE Ishockey	(United Kingdom) Nottingham Panthers	(Belarus) Neman Grodno	(Denmark) Vojens
—	2020–21	Cancelled due to the COVID-19 pandemic			
24	2021–22	(Poland) Cracovia	(Kazakhstan) Saryarka Karagandy	(Denmark) Aalborg Pirates	(Denmark) Aalborg
25	2022–23	(Slovakia) HK Nitra	(France) Ducs d'Angers	(United Kingdom) Cardiff Devils	(France) Angers
26	2023–24	(Kazakhstan) Nomad Astana	(Denmark) Herning Blue Fox	(United Kingdom) Cardiff Devils	(United Kingdom) Cardiff
27	2024–25	(United Kingdom) Cardiff Devils	(France) Brûleurs de Loups	(Poland) GKS Katowice	(United Kingdom) Cardiff
28	2025–26	(United Kingdom) Nottingham Panthers	(Kazakhstan) Torpedo Ust-Kamenogorsk	(Denmark) Herning Blue Fox	(United Kingdom) Nottingham
29	2026–27				

== Medals ==
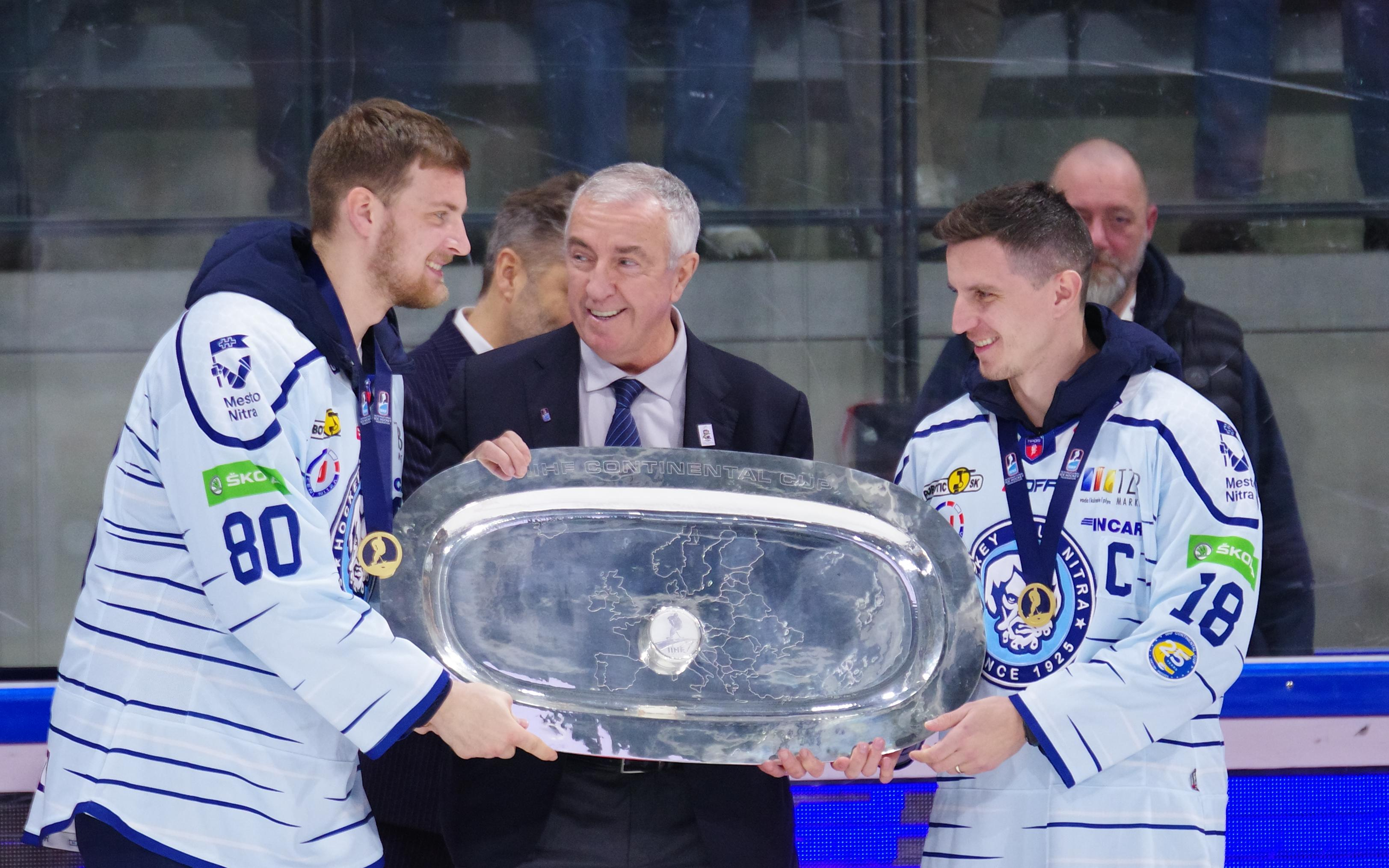
IIHF Continental Cup trophy

Rank	Nation	Gold	Silver	Bronze	Total
1	Slovakia	5	1	2	8
2	Belarus	4	4	1	9
3	Switzerland	4	0	3	7
4	Great Britain	3	3	4	10
5	Kazakhstan	2	4	1	7
6	France	2	3	2	7
6	Russia	2	3	2	7
8	Denmark	1	2	4	7
9	Ukraine	1	1	1	3
10	Austria	1	1	0	2
11	Poland	1	0	3	4
12	Finland	1	0	2	3
13	Norway	1	0	0	1
14	Germany	0	3	0	3
15	Latvia	0	2	0	2
16	Italy	0	1	2	3
17	Hungary	0	0	1	1
Totals (17 entries)		28	28	28	84

== See also ==
- Champions Hockey League
- IIHF Super Cup
