= AMDG Milano =

Associazione Milanese Disco Ghiaccio
- City: Milan, Italy
- League: Serie A
- Founded: 1937

Franchise history
- 1937-1941: AMDG Milano

Associazione Milanese Disco Ghiaccio Milano (AMDG) was an ice hockey team in Milan, Italy. The club was formed in 1937 by the merger of ADG Milano and HC Diavoli Rossoneri Milano.

They competed in the Serie A in the 1938 and 1941 seasons, winning the championship both times.

The club also consisted of second and third teams. The second team (AMDG Milano II) lost to the first team in the final in 1938 and 1941. The third team (AMDG Milano III) lost to the second team in the qualification round in 1941.

== Achievements ==
- Serie A champion (2): 1938, 1941.
