= 1988–89 Serie A (ice hockey) season =

Italian professional ice hockey season

The 1988–89 Serie A season was the 55th season of the Serie A, the top level of ice hockey in Italy. 10 teams participated in the league, and AS Varese Hockey won the championship by defeating HC Fassa in the final.

== First round ==
	Club	GP	W	T	L	GF–GA	Pts
1.	AS Varese Hockey	36	25	7	4	191:110	57
2.	HC Bozen	36	22	5	9	175:126	49
3.	Asiago Hockey	36	18	6	12	220:169	42
4.	HC Fassa	36	17	3	16	147:151	37
5.	HC Milan	36	16	5	15	169:149	37
6.	HC Alleghe	36	15	6	15	170:186	36
7.	HC Brunico	36	13	5	18	154:179	31
8.	HC Meran	36	11	7	18	162:225	29
9.	HC Fiemme Cavalese	36	12	2	22	166:201	26
10.	SG Cortina	36	5	6	25	130:188	16

== Final round ==
=== Group A ===
	Club	GP	W	T	L	GF–GA	Pts (Bonus)
1.	AS Varese Hockey	6	6	0	0	37:15	20(8)
2.	HC Fassa	6	3	0	3	28:20	11(5)
3.	HC Milan	6	3	0	3	33:26	10(4)
4.	HC Meran	6	0	0	6	28:65	1(1)

=== Group B ===
	Club	GP	W	T	L	GF–GA	Pts (Bonus)
1.	Asiago Hockey	6	5	1	0	36:23	17(6)
2.	HC Bozen	6	3	1	2	40:28	14(7)
3.	HC Brunico	6	1	2	3	26:38	6(2)
4.	HC Alleghe	6	1	0	5	23:36	5(3)

== Playoffs ==
=== Semifinals ===
- AS Varese Hockey - HC Bozen 2:0 (3:2, 7:3)
- Asiago Hockey - HC Fassa 1:2 (8:7, 3:4 OT, 2:8)

=== Final ===
- AS Varese Hockey - HC Fassa 3:0 (2:1 OT, 6:0, 4:2)
