= HC Milano Saima =

- City: Milan, Italy
- League: Serie A
- Founded: 1985
- Operated: 1985-1992; 1993-1995

Hockey Club Milano (better known as Hockey Club Milano Saima after its sponsor) was an ice hockey team in Milan, Italy.

== History ==
The club was founded in 1985 and initially played in the Serie B. They made their debut in the Serie A during the 1988-89 season. Milano won their first and only Serie A championship in the 1990-91 season, where they finished in first place in both the first and final rounds.

The club was disbanded after the 1991-92 season, where they finished as runners-up after losing to the HC Devils Milano in the final. They did not participate in the 1992-93 season but were revived as Sportivi Ghiaccio Milano the following year. The new team played two seasons (1993-94 and 1994-95) in the Serie A, losing in the quarterfinals in 1994 and the semifinals in 1995. The club was then sold and became HC 24 Milan.

== Achievements ==
- Serie A champion (1): 1991.
