= HC Varese =

HCMV Varese Hockey
- Nickname: Mastini, Gialloneri
- City: Varese, Italy
- League: IHL
- Division: Italian Hockey League
- Founded: 1977; 49 years ago
- Home arena: PalAlbani (capacity: 1.100 seats)
- Colors
- Owner(s): Carlo Bino
- General manager: Matteo Malfatti
- Head coach: Gaber Glavic
- Affiliate: Aosta Gladiators
- Website: https://www.hcmvvaresehockey.it/
- Giallo/Nera

Championships
- Federation Cups: 1 (1995)
- Serie As: 2 (1987) (1989)
- Italian Cups: 1 (2023)

Hockey Club Varese is an ice hockey team from Varese, Italy. It was created on 1977 under the name A.S. Mastini Varese Hockey. In 2005 (June) the club folded, but it continued to play in the Under 19 series under the name Hockey Club Varese, a new team founded in August 2005. In 2008 the club reintegrated the professional championship (Serie A2). In 2017 Killer Bees and Mastini Varese, the two Varese's non-professional teams, associated to create a new identity named Hockey Club Varese Bandits. In 2018, HC Varese 1977 s.c.s.d. came back to the Mastini naming.

== Roster ==
Portieri

- (Ukraine) 30 Artur Ogandzhanyan
- (Italy) 95 Filippo Matonti
- (Italy) 90 Leonardo Mordenti

Difensori

- (Italy) 3 Andrea Schina
- (Italy) 7 Nicolò Fanelli
- (Ukraine) 18 Valeri Raskin
- (Italy) 22 Erik Mazzacane
- (Finland) 38 William Mäkinen
- (Italy) 69 Alex Bertin
- (Italy) 94 Marco Matonti

Attaccanti

- (Spain) 8 Luca Basile Gonzalez
- (Italy) 9 Dylan Ghiglione
- (Canada) (Italy) 12 Marco Franchini
- (Italy) 13 Andrea Fornasetti
- (Italy) 15 Gianluca Tilaro
- (Italy) 16 Andrea Vanetti
- (Italy) 19 Sebastian Allevato
- (Italy) 23 Marcello Borghi
- (Italy) 24 Dennis Perino
- (Italy) 27 Michael Mazzacane
- (Italy) 32 Pietro Borghi
- (Italy) 42 Filippo Crivellari
- (Italy) 55 Alessio Piroso
- (Italy) 66 Alessandro Crivellari
- (Finland) 78 Mikael Kuronen
- (Italy) 91 Edoardo Raimondi

=== Head coach ===
- Gaber Glavic

== Hall of Fame ==
- Scudetti: 1986/1987 e 1988/1989
- Federation Cup: 1995
- Italian Cup:2022-2023

== Notable players ==
- (Canada) Jan Alston
- (Italy) Luciano Basile
- (Canada) Jim Benning
- (Canada) (Italy) Chad Biafore
- (Italy) Giacinto Boni
- (Italy) Marcello Borghi
- (Canada) (Italy) Luca Brugnoni
- (Canada) Mario Brunetta
- (Canada) (Italy) Joe Busillo
- (Canada) (Italy) James Camazzola
- (Italy) Cesare Carlacci
- (Canada) (Italy) Maurizio Catenacci
- (Canada) (Italy) Angelo Catenaro
- (Canada) (United Kingdom) Greg Chambers
- (Canada) Jason Chimera
- (Canada) (Italy) Mario Brian Chitarroni
- (Canada) (Italy) Anthony Circelli
- (Canada) Al Conroy
- (Canada) (Italy) Jim Corsi
- (Canada) Tony Currie
- (Canada) (Italy) Mario Debenedictis
- (Italy) (Switzerland) Paolo Della Bella
- (Canada) (Italy) Bob DePiero
- (Italy) Mark Demetz
- (Canada) (Italy) Paolo Di Dio
- (Canada) (Italy) Albert Di Fazio
- (Canada) Murray Eaves
- (Canada) Cary Farelli
- (Canada) (Italy) Daniel Fascinato
- (Canada) (Italy) Stefano Figliuzzi
- (Italy) Alessandro Galli
- (Italy) Luca Galeone
- (Canada) Kim Gellert
- (Italy) Werner Holzner
- (Canada) Denis Houle
- (Canada) Gordon Hynes
- (Canada) (Italy) Piero Greco
- (Canada) (Italy) Pat Iannone
- (Canada) (Italy) Emilio Iovio
- (Canada) Stéphane Julien
- (Finland) Mikko Lahteela
- (Italy) (United States) Thomas Larkin
- (Canada) Jim Leavins
- (Canada) Bryan Lefley
- (Ukraine) Andrei Lupandin
- (Italy) Stefan Mair
- (Italy) Matteo Malfatti
- (Canada) (Italy) Maurizio Mansi
- (Italy) Roberto Marchiorato
- (Italy) (United States) Mike Mastrullo
- (Canada) (Italy) Tony Martino
- (Canada) (Italy) Pat Mazzoli
- (Canada) Tony McKegney
- (Italy) Giancarlo Merzario
- (Canada) (Italy) Corrado Micalef
- (United States) (Italy) Pat Micheletti
- (Canada) (Italy) Peter Michelutti
- (Italy) Ico Migliore
- (Italy) Matteo Migliorin
- (Canada) (Italy) Tom Milani
- (Italy) Filippo Milo
- (Canada) Mark Napier
- (Canada) (Italy) Mario Nobili
- (Canada) (Italy) Frank Nigro
- (United States) (Republic of Ireland) Steve O'Brien
- (Sweden) Anders Olsson
- (Canada) (Italy) Mauro Papalillo
- (Canada) (Italy) Jonathan Pittis
- (Italy) John Prase
- (Italy) Marco Rizzo
- (Italy) Stefano Rizzo
- (Canada) (Italy) Vezio Sacratini
- (Finland) Joel Salonen
- (Italy) Sabino Sansonna
- (Canada) Claudio Scremin
- (Italy) Fabio Sguazzero
- (Canada) Brad Shaw
- (Italy) Alex Silva
- (Canada) Daniel Sisca
- (Czech Republic) Lukas Smital
- (Italy) Salvatore Sorrenti
- (Italy) Tommaso Teruggia
- (Italy) Ricky Tessari
- (Italy) Derek Toletti
- (United States) (Italy) David Tomassoni
- (Canada) (Italy) Carter Trevisani
- (Canada) Larry Trader
- (Russia) Mikhail Vasiliev
- (Italy) Giovanni Volante
- (Canada) Greg Willers
- (Italy) Vittorio Zafalon
- (Canada) (Italy) Ivano Zanatta
- (Ukraine) Alex Zinevych

== Curiosity ==
- Delitto a Porta Romana, a 1980 movie by Bruno Corbucci, was set in Milan and a hockey game scene was shot at PalAlbani of Varese.
