= Diavoli HC Milano =

- City: Milan, Italy
- League: Serie A
- Founded: 1958

Franchise history
- 1958-1979: Diavoli HC Milano

Diavoli HC Milano was an ice hockey team in Milan, Italy. The club was formed in 1958 as the successor to Milan-Inter HC.

They competed in the Serie A in most years from 1958 to 1979. Diavoli won the championship in the 1959–60 season, and were coached by Bibi Torriani.
