= HC Diavoli Rossoneri Milano =

- City: Milan, Italy
- League: Serie A
- Founded: 1933
- Folded: 1956

HC Diavoli Rossoneri Milano was an ice hockey team in Milan, Italy. They played in the Serie A, the top level of ice hockey in Italy.

== History ==
The club was founded in 1933 and won their first of four Serie A championships in 1935. They also won the Spengler Cup three times, the first of them being in 1934.

They merged with HC Milano in 1937, a merger which lasted until 1941.

After World War II, the club became independent again. This lasted until 1956, when financial problems forced another merger with HC Milano.

== Achievements ==
- Serie A champion (4): 1935, 1936, 1949, 1953.
- Serie A runner-up (3): 1937, 1947, 1952.
- Spengler Cup champion (3): 1934, 1935, 1950.
- Basler Cup champion (1): 1950.
