= Hockey Club Milano =

Defunct ice hockey team in Milan, Italy

- Sport: Ice hockey
- Founded: 1924
- Folded: 1956
- League: Campionato italiano di hockey su ghiaccio
- Team history: Hockey Club Milano (1924–1936, 1946–1950); Associazione Disco Ghiaccio Milano (1936–1937); Hockey Club Milano Inter (1950–1956)
- Location: Milan, Italy
- Championships: 2
- League titles: 15

Hockey Club Milano was an Italian ice hockey team based in Milan. Throughout its history, the team has changed its name twice. It was previously called Associazione Disco Ghiaccio Milano (1936–1937) and Hockey Club Milano Inter (1950–1956). It bore the name Hockey Club Milano for the longest consecutive and longest composite times (1924–1936, 1946–1950).

The club was founded in 1924 and finally folded in 1956. They were one of founder members of the Campionato italiano di hockey su ghiaccio and were its first champion, in 1925. From 1937 to 1946, the club was disbanded by order of the FISC, and its players were part of the HC Diavoli Rossoneri Milano renamed as AC Milanese DG at that time.

== Achievements ==
- Italian Serie A Ice Hockey:
  - Winners (15): 1925, 1926, 1927, 1930, 1931, 1933, 1934, 1937, 1947, 1948, 1950, 1951, 1952, 1954, 1955.
- Spengler Cup:
  - Winners (2): 1953, 1954.
