= HC Gherdëina =

Gherdëina
- City: Sëlva, South Tyrol
- League: Alps Hockey League
- Founded: 1927; 99 years ago
- Home arena: Pranives Ice Stadium (cap: 2,000)
- Colours: Red, blue
- Head coach: Joni Petrell
- Website: hcgherdeina.com

Hockey Club Gherdëina, also known as HC Gardena, currently named HC Gherdeina valgardena.it due to sponsorship reasons, is an Italian professional ice hockey team, which plays in the Alps Hockey League, having formerly played in the top division of Italian ice hockey, the Serie A. Originally based in Urtijëi, since 1999 they play their home games at the Pranives Ice Stadium, located in Sëlva, South Tyrol.

== Achievements ==
- Italian League:
  - Winners (4) : 1969, 1976, 1980, 1981

== Notable players ==
- Claude Lefebvre
- Jorma Valtonen
- Brad McGowan
- Lasse Oksanen
- Timo Lahtinen
- Craig Norwich
- Gaston Gingras
- Jim Corsi
- Tim Krug
- Frank Nigro
- Kim Gellert
- David Tomassoni
- Jim Koleff
