= SG Cortina =

- City: Cortina d'Ampezzo, Italy
- League: Alps Hockey League
- Founded: 1924; 102 years ago
- Home arena: Stadio Olimpico del Ghiaccio
- Colors: Blue, white
- Media: Official website

Championships
- Playoff championships: 18 Serie A 3 Coppa Italia

Sportivi Ghiaccio Cortina is a professional ice hockey team from Italy. They play their home games at Stadio Olimpico del Ghiaccio, located in Cortina d'Ampezzo, Veneto. They currently play in the Alps Hockey League and formerly the Serie A.

== Achievements ==
- Serie A:
  - Winners (18) : 1932, 1957, 1959, 1961, 1962, 1964, 1965, 1966, 1967, 1968, 1970, 1971, 1972, 1974, 1975, 2007, 2023, 2025
- Coppa Italia:
  - Winners (3) : 1973, 1974, 2012
- Basler Cup:
  - Winners (1) : 1958

== Players ==
=== Notable players ===
(Canada)

- Adam Munro
- Dan Sullivan

(Sweden)

- Jonas Johansson

(United States)

- Matt Cullen
