= Italian Hockey League Serie A =

Italian professional ice hockey league

IHL – Serie A
- Sport: Ice hockey
- Founded: 1925; 101 years ago
- No. of teams: 7
- Country: Italy
- Most recent champion: Asiago Hockey (2025–26)
- Most titles: Bolzano (19)
- Level on pyramid: Level 1
- Relegation to: Italian Hockey League - Serie B
- Website: http://www.lihg.it/

Italian Hockey League Serie A, formerly known as Serie A, is the top tier of professional ice hockey in Italy, which first began play in 1925. They are conducted under the authority of the Federazione Italiana Sport del Ghiaccio (FISG). The league initially merged with the Inter-National League to become the Alps Hockey League in 2016. Italian teams in the Alps Hockey League also compete in the Italian Hockey League – Serie A.

The league was known as Elite.A during the 2013–14 season, and as Italian Hockey League – Elite during the 2017–18 season.

== Playing format ==
- First part: "Regular season" – Every team plays four matches (2 home and 2 on the road) against each other. Team points are then halved and the second part begins.
- Second part: "Master round/Relegation round" – Teams are divided into two groups, the master round (Group A) with the top 4 teams and the relegation round (Group B) with the last 5 teams. Every team plays two matches (1 home and 1 on the road) against the teams of its group. In the end, the final standings determine the playoff tree. 8 teams access to the playoff: the 4 teams in Group A and the best 4 teams in Group B). The last one of the relegation round ends the season sooner but it won't play in the lower division next year, since no movements from one division to another are foreseen.
- Third part: "Play Off" – Quarterfinals: 1A vs 4B, 2A vs 3B, 3A vs 2B, 4A vs 1B. Quarterfinals, semifinals and finals will be played at the best of 5.

Points: Win 2 points – Tie 1 point

== Serie A champions ==
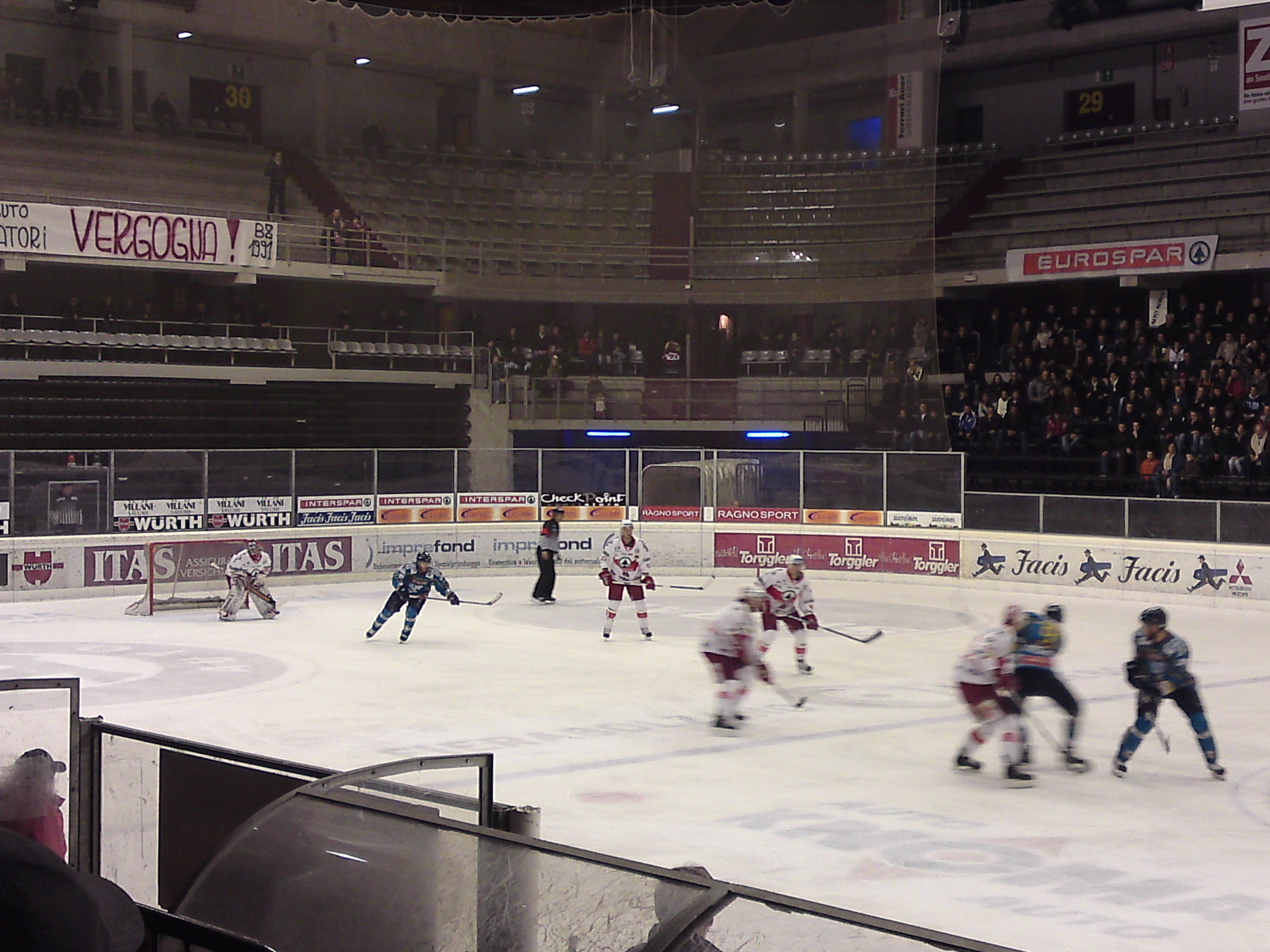
HC Bolzano – SG Pontebba in 2009

- 1925 – HC Milano
- 1926 – HC Milano
- 1927 – HC Milano
- 1928 – No championship
- 1929 – No championship
- 1930 – HC Milano
- 1931 – HC Milano
- 1932 – SG Cortina
- 1933 – HC Milano
- 1934 – HC Milano
- 1935 – HC Diavoli Rossoneri Milano
- 1936 – HC Diavoli Rossoneri Milano
- 1937 – ADG Milano
- 1938 – AMDG Milano ¹
- 1939 – No championship
- 1940 – No championship
- 1941 – AMDG Milano ¹
- 1942 – No championship
- 1943 – No championship
- 1944 – No championship
- 1945 – No championship
- 1946 – No championship
- 1947 – HC Milano
- 1948 – HC Milano
- 1949 – HC Diavoli Rossoneri Milano
- 1950 – HC Milano
- 1951 – HC Milano Inter
- 1952 – HC Milano Inter
- 1953 – HC Diavoli Rossoneri Milano
- 1954 – HC Milano Inter
- 1955 – HC Milano Inter
- 1956 – No championship
- 1957 – SG Cortina
- 1958 – Milan-Inter HC ¹
- 1959 – SG Cortina
- 1960 – Diavoli HC Milano ¹
- 1961 – SG Cortina
- 1962 – SG Cortina
- 1963 – HC Bolzano
- 1964 – SG Cortina
- 1965 – SG Cortina
- 1966 – SG Cortina
- 1967 – SG Cortina
- 1968 – SG Cortina
- 1969 – HC Gherdëina
- 1970 – SG Cortina
- 1971 – SG Cortina
- 1972 – SG Cortina
- 1973 – HC Bolzano
- 1974 – SG Cortina
- 1975 – SG Cortina
- 1976 – HC Gherdëina
- 1977 – HC Bolzano
- 1978 – HC Bolzano
- 1979 – HC Bolzano
- 1980 – HC Gherdëina
- 1981 – HC Gherdëina
- 1982 – HC Bolzano
- 1983 – HC Bolzano
- 1984 – HC Bolzano
- 1985 – HC Bolzano
- 1986 – HC Merano
- 1987 – AS Mastini Varese Hockey
- 1988 – HC Bolzano
- 1989 – AS Mastini Varese Hockey
- 1990 – HC Bolzano
- 1991 – HC Milano Saima
- 1992 – HC Devils Milano
- 1993 – HC Devils Milano
- 1994 – AC Milan Hockey ²
- 1995 – HC Bolzano
- 1996 – HC Bolzano
- 1997 – HC Bolzano
- 1998 – HC Bolzano
- 1999 – HC Merano
- 2000 – HC Bolzano
- 2001 – Asiago Hockey AS
- 2002 – HC Milano Vipers
- 2003 – HC Milano Vipers
- 2004 – HC Milano Vipers
- 2005 – HC Milano Vipers
- 2006 – HC Milano Vipers
- 2007 – SG Cortina
- 2008 – HC Bolzano
- 2009 – HC Bolzano
- 2010 – Asiago Hockey
- 2011 – Asiago Hockey
- 2012 – HC Bolzano
- 2013 – Asiago Hockey
- 2014 – Ritten Sport
- 2015 – Asiago Hockey
- 2016 – Ritten Sport
- 2017 – Ritten Sport
- 2018 – Ritten Sport
- 2019 – Ritten Sport
- 2020 – Asiago Hockey
- 2021 – Asiago Hockey
- 2022 – Asiago Hockey
- 2023 – SG Cortina
- 2024 – Ritten Sport
- 2025 – SG Cortina
- 2026 – Asiago Hockey

¹ AMDG, HC Milan Inter and HC Diavoli Milano are teams which were born from the fusion of HC Milano & HC Diavoli Rossoneri Milano.
² HC Devils Milano adopted the name 'AC Milan Hockey' for the 1993–94 season.

== Notable players ==
=== Foreigners ===
- Craig Adams
- Éric Bélanger
- Colin Chaulk
- Ryan Christie
- Matt Cullen
- Mathieu Dandenault
- Chris DiDomenico
- Magnus Eriksson
- Rico Fata
- Dmitri Gogolev
- David Haas
- Greg Hawgood
- Niklas Hjalmarsson
- Jaromír Jágr
- Thomas Kowalski
- Jari Kurri
- Bob Manno
- Steve McKenna
- Frank Nigro
- Dušan Pašek
- Steve Passmore
- Fernando Pisani
- Stéphane Quintal
- Cliff Ronning
- Blaine Stoughton
- Mikhail Vasiliev
- Ken Yaremchuk

=== Italians ===
- Jim Corsi
- Jason Muzzatti
- Gaetano Orlando
- Mike Rosati
- Michele Strazzabosco
- Lucio Topatigh
- Carter Trevisani
- Bruno Zarrillo
