= Bill Stewart (ice hockey) =

Canadian-Italian ice hockey player and coach

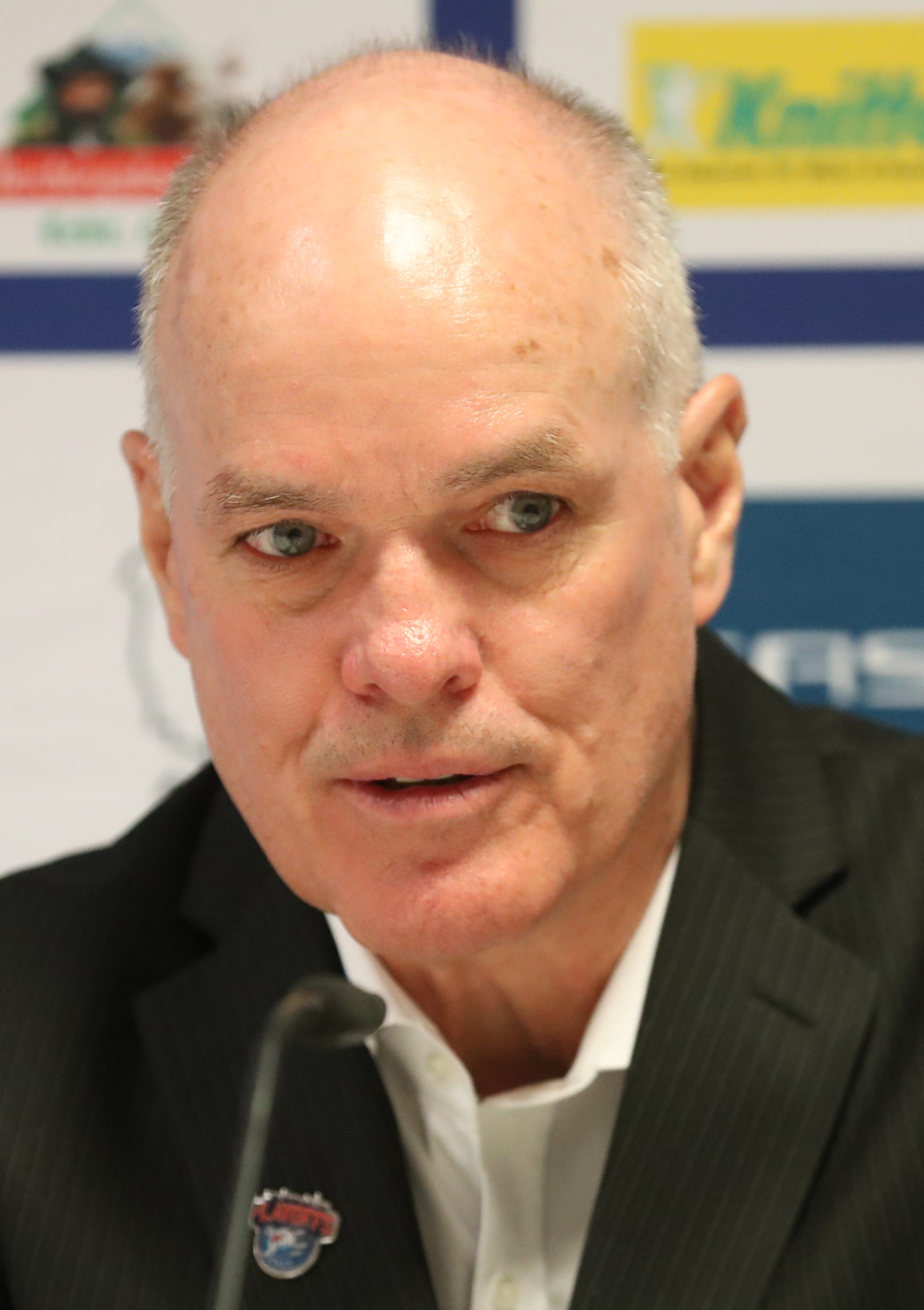
- Born: October 6, 1957 (age 68) Toronto, Ontario, Canada
- Height: 6 ft 2 in (188 cm)
- Weight: 190 lb (86 kg; 13 st 8 lb)
- Position: Defence
- Shot: Right
- Played for: Buffalo Sabres; St. Louis Blues; Toronto Maple Leafs; Minnesota North Stars; EV MAK Bruneck; HC Milano Saima; HC Gherdëina; HC Lions Courmaosta
- National team: Italy
- NHL draft: 68th overall, 1977; Buffalo Sabres
- WHA draft: 46th overall, 1977; Winnipeg Jets
- Playing career: 1977–1995

William Donald Stewart (born October 6, 1957) is a Canadian-born Italian former professional ice hockey defenceman and former coach. He played in the National Hockey League between 1977 and 1986, and then played in the Italian Serie A from 1986 to 1995. He later became a coach for the New York Islanders during the 1998–99 season. Internationally Stewart played for the Italian national team at the 1992 and 1994 Winter Olympics, and two World Championships.

== Playing career ==
As a youth, Stewart played in the 1969 Quebec International Pee-Wee Hockey Tournament with a minor ice hockey team from York Mills. A native of Toronto, Ontario, he was drafted in the fourth round (68th overall) in the 1977 NHL entry draft by the Buffalo Sabres and started his National Hockey League career in 1977-78. He also went on to play for the St. Louis Blues, Toronto Maple Leafs, and Minnesota North Stars. He left the NHL at the end of the 1985–86 season choosing to play hockey in Italy until his retirement in 1995.

== Coaching career ==
Stewart began his professional coaching career with the Muskegon Fury of the Colonial Hockey League in 1995. After one season with Muskegon, Stewart took the head coaching position with the Oshawa Generals of the OHL in 1996. Stewart got back into coaching professional hockey the following season with a stint in the American Hockey League and coaching the Saint John Flames to the Calder Cup Finals in 1998, losing to the Philadelphia Phantoms in six games.

Stewart was named head coach of the New York Islanders on January 21, 1999, after Mike Milbury himself stepped down to concentrate solely on his GM duties. After finishing the season with the Islanders, Stewart was relieved of his coaching duties and was replaced by Butch Goring on April 30, 1999.

In 1999, Stewart returned to the OHL to become the head coach of the Barrie Colts. The roster that year included the four "Brampton Boys", one of whom, Ryan Barnes, faced charges of assault with a weapon after a stick-swinging incident during a game in October. Later in the season, three of the team's other players were charged with sexual assault. Finally, Stewart himself made headlines and was banned from entering the United States for twice smuggling a Ukrainian-born player over the Canada-U.S. border in the baggage compartment of the team bus. Stewart infamously walked out of the Halifax Metro Centre without conducting any interviews with the media, following Barrie's 6-2 loss to the Rimouski Océanic in the 2000 Memorial Cup championship game.

Following the controversial season in Barrie, Stewart continued his coaching career in Germany, and made headlines during the DEL quarterfinals in 2001 when he was involved in a mass brawl in game three against the Berlin Capitals, during which he hit Capitals' head coach Pavel Gross in the head and Stewart was injured as well. He was handed a two-game suspension and a DM 15,000 fine. In the finals against the München Barons, he feigned fainting behind the Adler Mannheim bench to buy his star player Jan Alston time to get his skates sharpened. His team ended up winning the championship that year and got to the finals the following season. Stewart left Mannheim in January 2003 after being informed that his contract would not be extended at the end of the season.

After a short stint in Krefeld, Stewart moved to Austria, where he coached the Graz 99ers and EHC Linz. He left Linz in December 2006 to return to Germany with the Hamburg Freezers. Linz challenged this transfer by seeking a restraining order, but lost the case. Stewart was sacked by the Freezers in December 2008.

On December 3, 2009, he agreed to take over as the head coach of Kölner Haie and was relieved of his duties in November 2011. He joined the Guelph Storm during the 2011-12 season as a consultant prior to being named assistant coach in 2012-13. He took over as interim head coach of the team in January 2015. The term "interim" was then removed prior to the end of the season. He resigned from the Storm in December 2015 after only two wins and went back to Germany in January 2016 to coach Dresdner Eislöwen of the DEL2.

Stewart was appointed head coach of the DEL's Straubing Tigers in April 2017. Concerning his past, he stated at that time: "I have experienced a lot in Europe, have had great success, but have to admit that I have gone too far at times. These moments happened some years ago and, in the meantime, I have learned and become more quiet." He was sacked as Straubing head coach on October 18, 2017, after his team won only five of the first 13 games of the season and dropped to the very bottom of the DEL standings.

On December 4, 2017, Stewart was named head of Adler Mannheim, returning for a second stint in charge at the club. His contract expired at the end of the 2017-18 season in which he guided the Adler team to an appearance in the playoff semifinals. He subsequently worked as a scout for the Adler organization.

== Career statistics ==
=== Regular season and playoffs ===
			Regular season					Playoffs
Season	Team	League	GP	G	A	Pts	PIM	GP	G	A	Pts	PIM
1973–74	Dixie Beehives	OPJHL	41	9	24	33	38	—	—	—	—	—
1974–75	Kitchener Rangers	OMJHL	55	6	15	21	70	—	—	—	—	—
1975–76	Kitchener Rangers	OMJHL	4	1	3	4	4	—	—	—	—	—
1975–76	St. Catharines Black Hawks	OMJHL	48	9	31	40	57	—	—	—	—	—
1976–77	Niagara Falls Flyers	OMJHL	59	18	37	55	202	—	—	—	—	—
1977–78	Buffalo Sabres	NHL	13	2	0	2	15	8	0	2	2	0
1977–78	Hershey Bears	AHL	54	6	18	24	92	—	—	—	—	—
1978–79	Buffalo Sabres	NHL	67	1	17	18	101	1	0	1	1	0
1979–80	Rochester Americans	AHL	63	12	28	40	189	4	1	2	3	42
1980–81	Rochester Americans	AHL	6	1	6	7	12	—	—	—	—	—
1980–81	St. Louis Blues	NHL	60	2	21	23	114	4	1	0	1	11
1980–81	Salt Lake Golden Eagles	CHL	2	0	0	0	2	—	—	—	—	—
1981–82	St. Louis Blues	NHL	22	0	5	5	25	—	—	—	—	—
1981–82	Salt Lake Golden Eagles	CHL	40	2	12	14	93	10	0	6	6	12
1982–83	St. Louis Blues	NHL	7	0	0	0	8	—	—	—	—	—
1982–83	Salt Lake Golden Eagles	CHL	62	10	42	52	143	5	1	4	5	8
1983–84	Toronto Maple Leafs	NHL	56	2	17	19	116	—	—	—	—	—
1984–85	Toronto Maple Leafs	NHL	27	0	2	2	32	—	—	—	—	—
1984–85	St. Catharines Saints	AHL	12	2	5	7	11	—	—	—	—	—
1985–86	Minnesota North Stars	NHL	8	0	2	2	13	—	—	—	—	—
1985–86	Springfield Indians	AHL	59	7	19	26	135	—	—	—	—	—
1986–87	EV MAK Bruneck	ITA	40	20	21	41	91	—	—	—	—	—
1987–88	EV MAK Bruneck	ITA	34	8	35	43	62	—	—	—	—	—
1988–89	HC Milano Saima	ITA	18	4	11	15	24	—	—	—	—	—
1989–90	Alaska Milano	ITA-22	25	27	32	59	40	—	—	—	—	—
1990–91	HC Milano Saima	ITA	34	11	33	44	52	10	0	9	9	10
1991–92	HC Milano Saima	ITA	17	3	16	19	8	12	0	6	6	20
1991–92	HC Milano Saima	ALP	20	2	6	8	64	—	—	—	—	—
1992–93	HC Devils Milano	ITA	12	2	4	6	26	11	1	4	5	28
1992–93	HC Devils Milano	ALP	32	0	9	9	60	—	—	—	—	—
1993–94	HC Gherdëina	ITA	17	3	7	10	17	2	0	0	0	0
1993–94	HC Gherdëina	ALP	27	5	12	17	21	—	—	—	—	—
1994–95	HC Lions Courmaosta	ITA	31	1	13	14	68	5	1	2	3	2
1994–95	HC Lions Courmaosta	ALP	17	4	7	11	18	—	—	—	—	—
ITA totals			203	52	140	192	348	40	2	21	23	60
NHL totals			260	7	64	71	424	13	1	3	4	11

=== International ===
Year	Team	Event	GP	G	A	Pts	PIM
1992	Italy	OLY	7	0	3	3	12
1992	Italy	WC	5	0	0	0	6
1993	Italy	WC	6	0	0	0	4
1994	Italy	OLY	6	0	0	0	0
Senior totals			24	0	3	3	22

== NHL Coaching statistics ==
=== NHL coaching statistics ===
Team	Year	Regular season						Postseason
Team	Year	G	W	L	T	Pts	Finish	Result
New York Islanders	1998–99	37	11	19	7	29	5th in Atlantic	Missed playoffs

== Awards and achievements ==
- 1997–98 - Louis A. R. Pieri Memorial Award - Saint John Flames

== Transactions ==
- October 30, 1980 - Traded by the Buffalo Sabres to the St. Louis Blues for Bob Hess and a 4th round pick in the 1981 NHL Entry Draft (Anders Wikberg)
- September 10, 1983 - Signed as a free agent by the Toronto Maple Leafs
- September 15, 1985 - Signed as a free agent by the Minnesota North Stars

Preceded by Mike Milbury	Head coach of the New York Islanders; 1999	Succeeded by Butch Goring
