= David Frost (ice hockey) =

Canadian sports agent

- Born: David James Frost; 1967 or 1968 (age 58–59); Toronto, Ontario, Canada
- Other name: Jim McCauley
- Occupation: NHL Players' Association agent
- Known for: Hockey Consultation

David James Frost, a.k.a. Jim McCauley, (born 1967 or 1968) is a former junior ice hockey coach and NHL Players' Association sports agent, best known as the alleged target of a murder-for-hire plot by one of his clients, former St. Louis Blues forward Mike Danton.

He at one time worked in Laguna Niguel, California under the alias Jim McCauley working out at the Laguna Niguel Hockey Academy.

On August 22, 2006, Frost was charged with 12 counts of sexual exploitation by the Ontario Provincial Police for crimes alleged during 1995–2001. The charges relate to his time as coach of the Quinte Hawks Junior hockey team and involve acts on four males and three females between the ages of 14 and 16. Frost spent around $200,000 to hire Marie Henein as his defence lawyer. Frost was found not guilty on those charges on November 29, 2008, after the judge in the case found "some testimony by government witnesses was simply not believable and he feared some of it had been tainted by collusion". Steve Simmons, writing in The Toronto Sun, criticized the poor performance by the Crown prosecutors, who neglected to call several witnesses who would have likely bolstered the case against Frost.

== "Brampton Boys" regime ==
Frost got his start as a coach with the Toronto Young Nationals, a PeeWee club where he coached, among others, Mike Jefferson (later Mike Danton), Sheldon Keefe, and Joe Goodenow (son of then NHLPA Head Bob Goodenow). He was suspended from the Metro Toronto Hockey League following allegations he forged the signature of the club's general manager. He then took his "Brampton Boys", a reference to the Toronto suburban city of Brampton, to the Quinte Hawks Metro Junior A Club in Deseronto. He was suspended from the Hawks after he pleaded guilty to a charge he assaulted (punched) a 21 year old Hawks player after he refused a reach around during a shower.

Frost's proteges were drafted the following season by Ontario Hockey League (OHL) teams; he was known to frequently attend Sarnia Sting games to monitor the progress of Jefferson, who would eventually be dealt to the Toronto St. Michael's Majors to play with Sheldon Keefe, Ryan Barnes and Shawn Cation, who rounded out the rest of Frost's "Brampton Boys". Frost, not officially associated with the team, created so many conflicts with the St. Mike's front office that all four of his "Brampton Boys" were traded to the Barrie Colts.

The Brampton Boys tenure in Barrie, while productive on the ice, was accompanied by bizarre behavior, especially compared to the traditional deference shown by junior players. Ryan Barnes was suspended for 25 games for a stick-swinging incident, while Shawn Cation was suspended for 15 games for instigating a line brawl. During the 2000 OHL playoffs, team captain Sheldon Keefe visibly refused to shake OHL commissioner David Branch's hand during the presentation of the J. Ross Robertson Cup. While playing at the 2000 Memorial Cup in Halifax, Frost's players led a walkout during a customary banquet and refused to shake hands with CHL commissioner David Branch during ceremonial face-offs. The players would later refuse to stand for the national anthem.

== Frost vs the Jeffersons ==
David Frost first approached Danton's parents, Steve and Sue Jefferson, in 1991, successfully recruiting Mike for the Young Nationals. The Jeffersons indicate that their son's recruiter, who later became his agent, wielded a growing influence over their son in the years that followed. As time passed, Frost's influence grew beyond the business of hockey.

Jefferson changed his name to Michael Sage Danton in 2002, a decision Frost said was made by the young player to separate himself from his family. Danton subsequently claimed that the Jefferson family had abused Mike, that they lived in squalor and had abused drugs and alcohol.

Though Danton made the National Hockey League (NHL), playing 87 games for the New Jersey Devils and St. Louis Blues, Frost retained almost complete control over the player. Frost required his permission for Danton to conduct interviews, and the player frequently asked Frost's opinion on many issues. Following the 2003–04 NHL season, Danton was arrested by the Federal Bureau of Investigation (FBI) after it was alleged he tried to hire a hit man to kill Frost. Danton pleaded guilty and was sentenced to 7½ years in prison, though he later alleged that it was his father he intended to kill, not Frost. Danton's claims were disputed by the FBI and the alleged hitman, both of whom agreed that Frost was the target.

== Resignation and charges ==
On 6 December 2005, the NHL Players' Association (NHLPA) announced that Frost has resigned as an NHL player agent. Frost no longer represented players and started a sports consulting company with his wife. Frost once worked with former Vancouver Canucks General Manager Mike Gillis when he was an NHLPA agent.

On March 23, 2007, Frost was also charged with fraud, impersonation and breach of probation for allegedly trying to purchase nearly $90 in gasoline by using a credit card registered to Mike Danton. He was acquitted of all charges on February 14, 2009; Danton informed the court that Frost had permission to use his credit cards.

While out on bail awaiting trial on sexual exploitation charges, Frost had his bail conditions amended to allow him to leave Canada. He had intended to attend the Phoenix Coyotes training camp to monitor the progress of a minor-league prospect. However, the Coyotes General Manager indicated that Frost would not be allowed to attend.

Since being acquitted on sexual exploitation charges in November, Frost launched a website claiming to "unleash secret stories about the NHL, [offer] closely guarded playbooks and [give] advice for young players trying to make the big league." Subsequently, Frost's website shut down.
