= Erik Reitz =

American ice hockey player

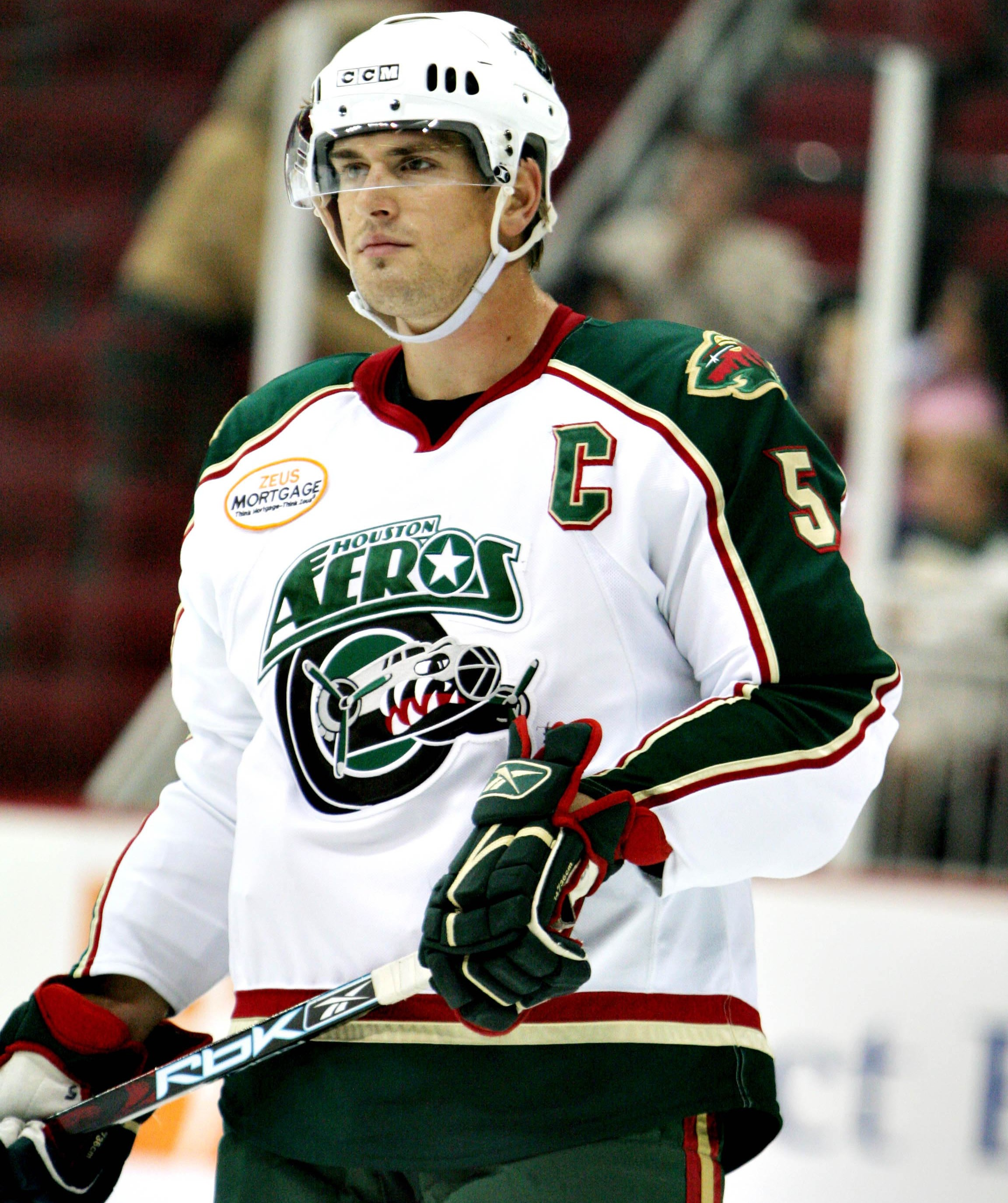
- Reitz with the Houston Aeros in 2007
- Born: July 29, 1982 (age 43) Detroit, Michigan, U.S.
- Height: 6 ft 1 in (185 cm)
- Weight: 222 lb (101 kg; 15 st 12 lb)
- Position: Defense
- Shot: Right
- Played for: Minnesota Wild; New York Rangers; HC Sibir Novosibirsk; EC Red Bull Salzburg
- National team: United States
- NHL draft: 170th overall, 2000; Minnesota Wild
- Playing career: 2002–2012

Erik Reitz (born July 29, 1982) is an American former professional ice hockey player, known as an enforcer, who played in the National Hockey League (NHL) with the Minnesota Wild and the New York Rangers.

== Playing career ==
Reitz was drafted 170th overall in the 2000 NHL entry draft by the Minnesota Wild from the Barrie Colts of the Ontario Hockey League. He plays defense, and has also spent six seasons with the Houston Aeros of the American Hockey League (AHL). He made his NHL debut with the Wild in the 2005–06 season, playing in 5 games.

Reitz made the Wild roster for the 2008–09 season and played in 31 games before he was traded by the Wild to the New York Rangers in exchange for Dan Fritsche on January 29, 2009. After 11 games with the Rangers, Erik was claimed off waivers by the Toronto Maple Leafs on March 4, 2009. Reitz never debuted for the Leafs after suffering a season-ending ankle injury on March 7, 2009.

On August 22, 2009, Reitz signed with Sibir Novosibirsk of the KHL. After a single season in Russia, Reitz left to sign a one-year contract for EC Red Bull Salzburg of Austria on November 10, 2010. Lacking match conditioning, Reitz trained with Salzburg for under a month before he was released without making his debut. Reitz returned to Salzburg the following 2011–12 season, appearing in 19 games for 1 assist before he was mutually released from his contract on January 30, 2012.

== Career statistics ==
=== Regular season and playoffs ===
			Regular season					Playoffs
Season	Team	League	GP	G	A	Pts	PIM	GP	G	A	Pts	PIM
1998–99	Leamington Flyers	WOHL	50	5	10	15	80	—	—	—	—	—
1999–2000	Barrie Colts	OHL	63	2	10	12	85	25	0	5	5	44
1999–2000	Barrie Colts	MC	—	—	—	—	—	5	0	1	1	4
2000–01	Barrie Colts	OHL	68	5	21	26	178	5	1	0	1	21
2001–02	Barrie Colts	OHL	61	13	27	40	153	20	4	16	20	40
2002–03	Houston Aeros	AHL	62	6	13	19	112	11	0	3	3	31
2003–04	Houston Aeros	AHL	69	5	19	24	148	2	0	0	0	0
2004–05	Houston Aeros	AHL	38	2	12	14	91	—	—	—	—	—
2005–06	Houston Aeros	AHL	72	5	23	28	139	8	0	5	5	20
2005–06	Minnesota Wild	NHL	5	0	0	0	4	—	—	—	—	—
2006–07	Houston Aeros	AHL	73	9	25	34	132	—	—	—	—	—
2006–07	Minnesota Wild	NHL	1	0	0	0	0	—	—	—	—	—
2007–08	Houston Aeros	AHL	49	8	26	34	99	3	0	0	0	2
2007–08	Minnesota Wild	NHL	—	—	—	—	—	2	0	0	0	0
2008–09	Minnesota Wild	NHL	31	1	1	2	41	—	—	—	—	—
2008–09	New York Rangers	NHL	11	0	0	0	24	—	—	—	—	—
2009–10	Sibir Novosibirsk	KHL	38	1	6	7	146	—	—	—	—	—
2011–12	EC Red Bull Salzburg	EBEL	19	0	1	1	49	—	—	—	—	—
AHL totals			363	35	118	153	721	24	0	8	8	53
NHL totals			48	1	1	2	69	2	0	0	0	0

=== International ===
Year	Team	Event	GP	G	A	Pts	PIM
2002	United States	WJC	7	0	1	1	12
Junior totals			7	0	1	1	12

== Awards and honors ==
Award	Year
Ontario Hockey League
Memorial Cup All-Star Team	2000
First All-Star Team	2002
Max Kaminsky Trophy	2002
