= Steve Simmons =

Canadian sports journalist

- Born: Toronto, Canada
- Education: University of Western Ontario
- Occupation: Sports journalist
- Writing career
- Period: 1979–present

Steve Simmons is a Canadian sports journalist with the Toronto Sun, and nationally syndicated throughout Sun Media. He previously worked as a sports columnist for the Calgary Herald, Calgary Sun, London Free Press, The Globe and Mail, and The Hockey News.

== Biography ==
Simmons was born in Toronto, and attended York Mills Collegiate Institute and the University of Western Ontario, where he was sports editor and sports columnist at the Western Gazette student paper. He lives in Thornhill, Ontario. Simmons is Jewish.

=== Career ===
Simmons first wrote for the Calgary Herald (starting as a junior sports editor in 1979) and Calgary Sun (starting in 1980). He joined the Toronto Sun in 1987, becoming a sports columnist for them two years later. Through 2013, he had covered 14 Olympic Games, 31 Stanley Cup playoffs, 13 Grey Cups, 12 Super Bowls, 4 World Series, 2 NBA Finals, and over 50 world championship fights.

He has co-written or contributed to several books on hockey. Among his books are one on former NHL player Mike Danton, who was imprisoned for conspiracy to commit murder after hiring a hitman to kill his agent, David Frost.

He has also been involved in broadcast media, including being a Day-one host on The Fan 590 in Toronto, and a Day-one studio contributor on what was then Headline Sports and later became The Score television network. Simmons is also seen as an occasional guest on Monday airings of TSN's The Reporters with Dave Hodge and heard across multiple shows on TSN 1050 radio.

He is an expert on Jews in sports.

Simmons won the 2013 Sports Media Canada George Gross Award for Outstanding Sportswriting.

=== Controversies ===
A regular feature of Simmons' weekend column is the "And hey, whatever became of..." question, which typically concerns a former athlete who has been out of the public eye for some time. In his May 17, 2014 column Simmons posed the question "And hey, whatever became of Alexander Karpovtsev?" Alexander Karpovtsev was killed three years earlier in the 2011 Lokomotiv Yaroslavl plane crash that claimed the lives of 44 members of the Lokomotiv Yaroslavl hockey team, an event that Simmons had devoted his September 7, 2011 column to. The reference to Karpovtsev has since been removed from the column.

In 2014, Simmons made headlines when José Bautista, outfielder of the Toronto Blue Jays, responded to criticisms Simmons made on Twitter about him with the dismissive reply, "who are you and why are you talking to me?" Simmons responded by claiming that a marketing firm wrote Bautista's tweets, not the star athlete himself. Bautista directly replied once more via Twitter confirming that he did in fact write his own tweets.

In 2015, Simmons created a controversy when, in a column he wrote for the Toronto Sun, he claimed that NHL forward Phil Kessel frequented a hot dog vendor located outside of his apartment on a daily basis. The column attracted the attention of ESPN personality Keith Olbermann, who awarded Simmons the title of "Worst Person In The Sports World". Within days, the accuracy of Simmons' column was called into question when contributors to a Toronto Maple Leafs related blog known as Pension Plan Puppets determined that Kessel did not live near where Simmons claimed he did. While participating as a guest on a local radio program, Simmons attempted to clarify the matter by claiming that there was a miscommunication with his source regarding the location of the hot dog vendor. He has yet to respond in print to address concerns about the accuracy of that column.

Simmons was referenced in a spoof letter supposedly written by Phil Kessel after Kessel had won the Stanley Cup with the Pittsburgh Penguins in 2016. The post script of the letter reads thus: "How did the country that produced literary giants like Margaret Atwood and Alice Munro also crap out Steve Simmons?"
