= Michel Périard =

Canadian-German ice hockey player

Michel Periard
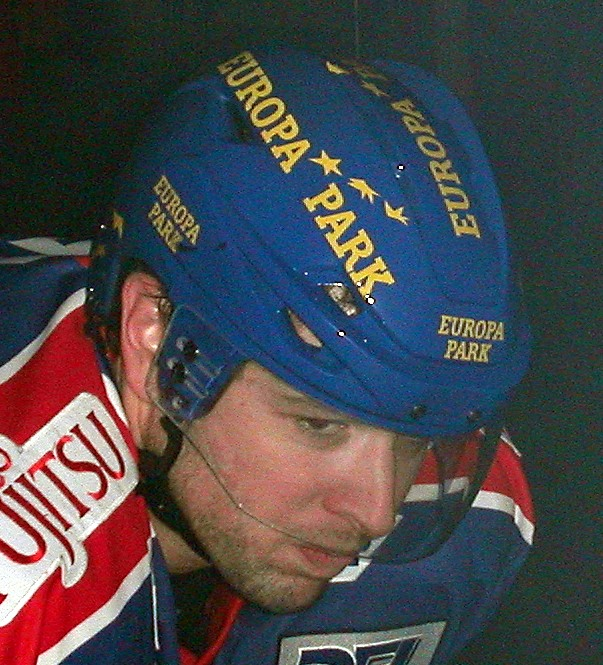
- Born: November 10, 1979 (age 46) Saint-Constant, Quebec, Canada
- Height: 5 ft 11 in (180 cm)
- Weight: 185 lb (84 kg; 13 st 3 lb)
- Position: Defenceman
- Shoots: Left
- DEL team Former teams: Free Agent; Louisville Panthers; San Antonio Rampage; Portland Pirates; Nürnberg Ice Tigers; Frankfurt Lions; Adler Mannheim; ERC Ingolstadt; Iserlohn Roosters
- NHL draft: 188th overall, 1998; Ottawa Senators
- Playing career: 2000–present

Michel Périard (born November 10, 1979) is a Canadian-German professional ice hockey defenceman who is currently an unrestricted free agent who last played for the Jonquière Marquis in the Ligue Nord-Américaine de Hockey (LNAH).

Périard played for several minor-league teams across four leagues before moving to the Deutsche Eishockey Liga in 2005, where he remained until 2017. He has held a German passport since October 2015.

== Playing career ==
Périard played junior hockey with Shawinigan Cataractes from 1997 until 1999, when he was traded to the Rimouski Oceanic to play with the club in the run to the Memorial Cup.

Périard was selected by the Ottawa Senators in the seventh round (188th overall) of the 1998 NHL entry draft, but did not sign with the club in the two years after the draft. He became a free agent and signed with the Florida Panthers in August 2000. Périard was assigned to the Rockford Ice Hogs for the 2000–01 season. Périard would play the next four seasons with various American minor league teams.

In 2005, Périard moved to Europe, signing with the Nürnberg Ice Tigers of the Deutsche Eishockey Liga (DEL). He has played since then in the DEL. In 2009, he transferred to Frankfurt Lions. He played the 2010–11 season with the Adler Mannheim of the DEL.

Upon completion of the 2012–13 season, Périard agreed to return for his third year with Ingolstadt in signing a one-year contract extension on April 30, 2013.

On September 7, 2015, Périard belatedly signed a contract to remain in Germany, agreeing to a one-year contract with the Iserlohn Roosters. In February 2016, it was announced that Périard has signed a contract extension with the Roosters that will keep him at the club through the 2016–17 season. After the 2016–17 season with the Roosters, in which he posted 15 assists, as Iserlohn finished out of playoff contention, it was announced that Périard's contract would not be renewed.

== Career statistics ==
			Regular season					Playoffs
Season	Team	League	GP	G	A	Pts	PIM	GP	G	A	Pts	PIM
1996–97	Collège Charles-Lemoyne	QMAAA	40	8	15	23		15	7	20	27
1997–98	Shawinigan Cataractes	QMJHL	68	14	30	44	64	5	0	0	0	18
1998–99	Shawinigan Cataractes	QMJHL	64	14	40	54	90	6	1	2	3	4
1999–2000	Rimouski Océanic	QMJHL	70	25	75	100	58	14	5	17	22	16
2000–01	Port Huron Border Cats	UHL	23	1	8	9	30	—	—	—	—	—
2000–01	Rockford IceHogs	UHL	31	3	14	17	20	—	—	—	—	—
2000–01	Louisville Panthers	AHL	7	0	1	1	0	—	—	—	—	—
2001–02	Macon Whoopee	ECHL	72	4	19	23	26	—	—	—	—	—
2002–03	Laredo Bucks	CHL	50	18	35	53	26	9	3	5	8	4
2002–03	San Antonio Rampage	AHL	10	3	5	8	6	—	—	—	—	—
2003–04	San Antonio Rampage	AHL	77	9	23	32	30	—	—	—	—	—
2004–05	Portland Pirates	AHL	52	2	21	23	8	—	—	—	—	—
2005–06	Nürnberg Ice Tigers	DEL	51	5	12	17	48	4	1	1	2	8
2006–07	Nürnberg Ice Tigers	DEL	51	6	24	30	82	13	1	4	5	18
2007–08	Nürnberg Ice Tigers	DEL	56	8	19	27	52	5	1	0	1	8
2008–09	Nürnberg Ice Tigers	DEL	49	11	22	33	36	5	1	1	2	6
2009–10	Frankfurt Lions	DEL	56	9	26	35	32	4	0	1	1	2
2010–11	Adler Mannheim	DEL	50	2	9	11	49	6	0	2	2	0
2011–12	ERC Ingolstadt	DEL	48	9	20	29	22	9	0	6	6	4
2012–13	ERC Ingolstadt	DEL	49	7	14	21	14	6	2	3	5	2
2013–14	ERC Ingolstadt	DEL	49	5	22	27	16	19	2	9	11	6
2014–15	ERC Ingolstadt	DEL	45	4	15	19	26	12	2	3	5	2
2015–16	Iserlohn Roosters	DEL	44	1	13	14	20	6	0	0	0	0
2016–17	Iserlohn Roosters	DEL	42	0	15	15	10	—	—	—	—	—
2017–18	Jonquière Marquis	LNAH	5	0	3	3	2	4	0	2	2	2
AHL totals			146	14	50	64	44	—	—	—	—	—
DEL totals			590	67	211	278	407	89	10	30	40	56

== Awards and honours ==
- Emile Bouchard Trophy - QMJHL Defenceman of the Year (1999–2000)
- Memorial Cup Champion with Rimouski Océanic (2000)
- Memorial Cup All-Star Team (2000)
- Played in the CHL All-Star game (2002–03)
- Central Hockey League Most Outstanding Defenceman (2002–03)
