= Kyle Wilson (ice hockey) =

Canadian ice hockey player (born 1984)

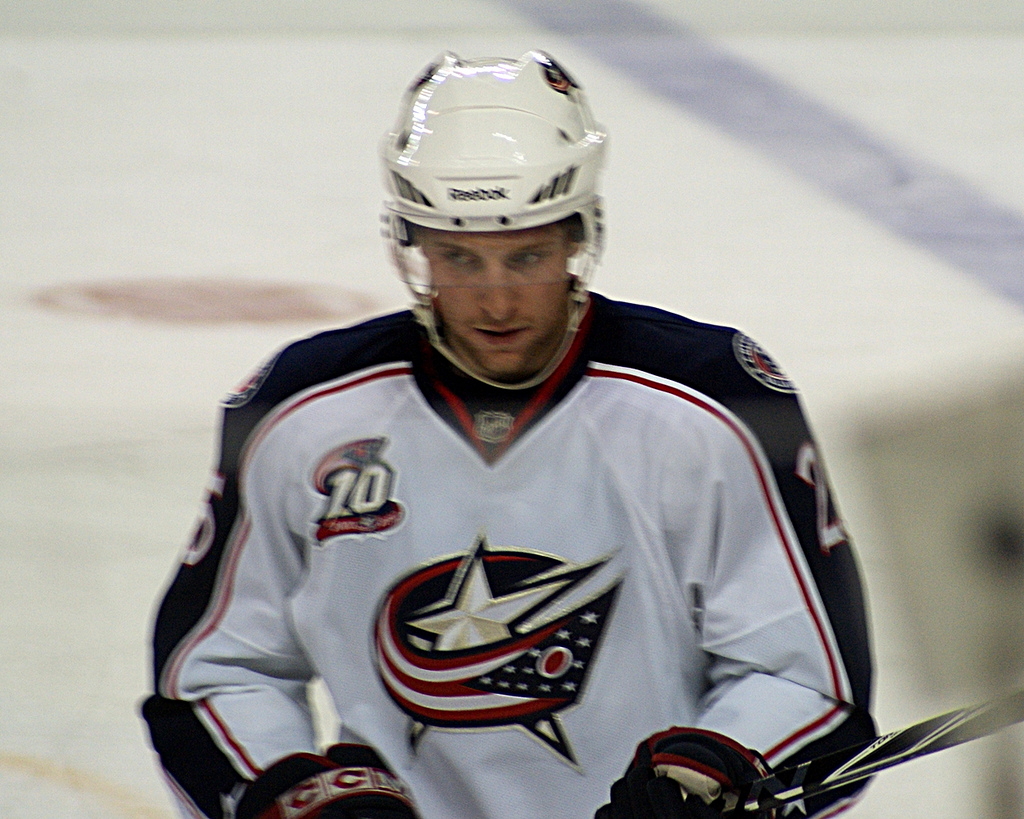
- Wilson with the Columbus Blue Jackets in 2010
- Born: December 15, 1984 (age 41) Oakville, Ontario, Canada
- Height: 6 ft 0 in (183 cm)
- Weight: 200 lb (91 kg; 14 st 4 lb)
- Position: Centre
- Shot: Left
- Played for: Washington Capitals; Columbus Blue Jackets; Nashville Predators; Dinamo Riga; Traktor Chelyabinsk; Modo Hockey; SCL Tigers; Eisbären Berlin
- NHL draft: 272nd overall, 2004; Minnesota Wild
- Playing career: 2006–2017

Kyle Wilson (born December 15, 1984) is a Canadian former professional Ice hockey centre who played in the National Hockey League (NHL) with the Washington Capitals, Columbus Blue Jackets and the Nashville Predators. Wilson played collegiate hockey for Colgate University, where he received a bachelor's degree in physics.

== Playing career ==
Kyle Wilson was selected in the ninth round, 272nd overall, by the Minnesota Wild in the 2004 NHL entry draft. He made his NHL debut in 2009–10 season with the Washington Capitals where he scored 2 assists in 2 games and finished with a +1 rating.

On July 2, 2010, Wilson signed a one-year contract as a free agent with the Columbus Blue Jackets. He started the 2010–11 season with Columbus and after being scratched for the first 5 games he made his Blue Jackets debut on October 22 where he took 2 penalties and ended with a -2 in the first period during a 6–2 loss to Calgary. Wilson was moved to the fourth line taking the place of the injured Ethan Moreau and he picked up his first NHL goal on October 25 against Brian Boucher of the Philadelphia Flyers.

On July 5, 2011, Wilson signed a two-year contract with the Nashville Predators. The first season of the contract is worth $550,000 in the NHL and $105,000 in the AHL. The second season is a one-way contract worth $550,000.

After his first season with the Predators on June 15, 2012, Wilson was traded along with Anders Lindback and a seventh-round draft pick to the Tampa Bay Lightning for Sébastien Caron, two second-round draft picks and a third-round draft pick. In the midst of a disappointing 2012–13 season scoring only 5 goals in 22 games with Lightning affiliate, the Syracuse Crunch, Wilson was traded by Tampa Bay to the Anaheim Ducks in exchange for Dan Sexton on March 11, 2013.

On June 12, 2013, Dinamo Riga of the Kontinental Hockey League (KHL) announced that they have signed a contract with Kyle Wilson. After spending the 2013–14 season in Riga, he split the following campaign between Dinamo and fellow KHL side Traktor Chelyabinsk.

He started the 2015-16 campaign with Modo Hockey of the Swedish Hockey League (SHL) and parted company with the team in December 2015. He then represented German team Adler Mannheim at the 2015 Spengler Cup, before signing a deal for the remainder of the season with the SCL Tigers of the Swiss National League A (NLA) in March 2016.

As a free agent on July 21, 2016, Wilson moved to Germany to sign a one-year contract with Eisbären Berlin of the DEL.

== Career statistics ==
			Regular season					Playoffs
Season	Team	League	GP	G	A	Pts	PIM	GP	G	A	Pts	PIM
2000–01	Strathroy Rockets	GOHL	33	12	17	29	15	5	2	2	4	2
2001–02	Strathroy Rockets	WOHL	53	42	25	67	16	5	2	3	5	2
2002–03	Colgate University	ECAC	33	4	2	6	15	—	—	—	—	—
2003–04	Colgate University	ECAC	37	14	17	31	23	—	—	—	—	—
2004–05	Colgate University	ECAC	30	5	18	23	12	—	—	—	—	—
2005–06	Colgate University	ECAC	39	23	18	41	22	—	—	—	—	—
2006–07	San Antonio Rampage	AHL	7	1	0	1	2	—	—	—	—	—
2006–07	South Carolina Stingrays	ECHL	5	3	2	5	4	—	—	—	—	—
2006–07	Hershey Bears	AHL	54	24	30	54	26	19	7	9	16	8
2007–08	Hershey Bears	AHL	80	30	31	61	26	5	0	3	3	2
2008–09	Hershey Bears	AHL	80	28	30	58	31	22	3	7	10	2
2009–10	Hershey Bears	AHL	77	24	29	53	23	21	6	6	12	4
2009–10	Washington Capitals	NHL	2	0	2	2	0	—	—	—	—	—
2010–11	Columbus Blue Jackets	NHL	32	4	7	11	12	—	—	—	—	—
2010–11	Springfield Falcons	AHL	23	12	12	24	2	—	—	—	—	—
2011–12	Milwaukee Admirals	AHL	68	22	32	54	25	3	1	2	3	2
2011–12	Nashville Predators	NHL	5	0	0	0	0	—	—	—	—	—
2012–13	Syracuse Crunch	AHL	22	5	0	5	6	—	—	—	—	—
2012–13	Norfolk Admirals	AHL	16	3	6	9	2	—	—	—	—	—
2013–14	Dinamo Rīga	KHL	49	17	27	44	26	—	—	—	—	—
2014–15	Traktor Chelyabinsk	KHL	22	1	5	6	10	—	—	—	—	—
2014–15	Dinamo Rīga	KHL	28	1	8	9	8	—	—	—	—	—
2015–16	Modo Hockey	SHL	22	5	8	13	41	—	—	—	—	—
2015–16	SCL Tigers	NLA	11	5	1	6	2	—	—	—	—	—
2016–17	Eisbären Berlin	DEL	48	11	9	20	14	12	0	2	2	6
AHL totals			427	149	170	319	143	70	17	27	44	18
NHL totals			39	4	9	13	12	—	—	—	—	—
KHL totals			99	19	40	59	44	—	—	—	—	—

== Awards and honors ==
Award	Year
College
All-ECAC Hockey Second Team	2005–06
