= Anders Lindbäck =

Swedish ice hockey player (born 1988)

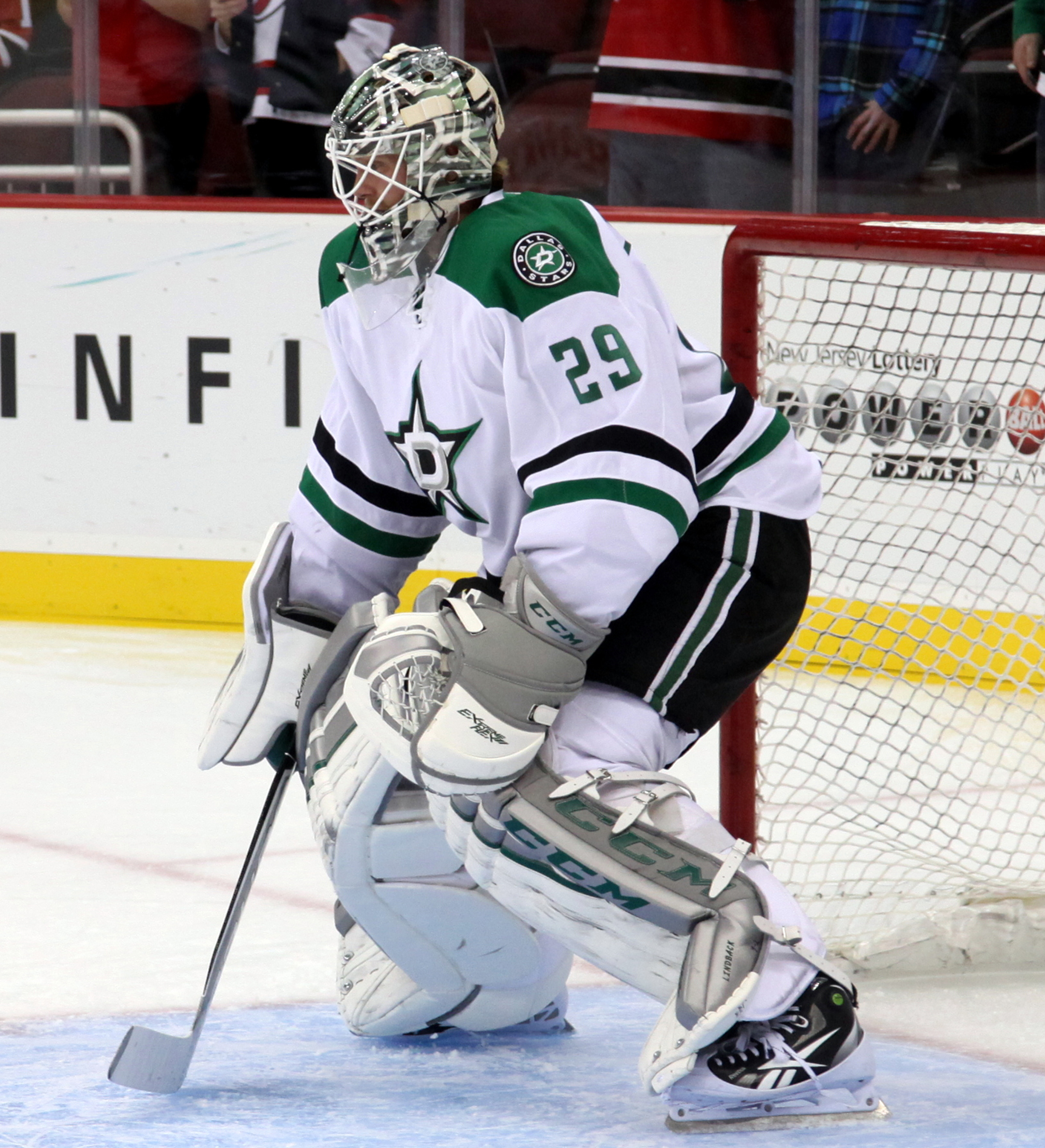
- Lindbäck in October 2014
- Born: 3 May 1988 (age 38) Gävle, Sweden
- Height: 198 cm (6 ft 6 in)
- Weight: 95 kg (209 lb; 14 st 13 lb)
- Position: Goaltender
- Catches: Left
- SHL team Former teams: Färjestad BK; Brynäs IF; Timrå IK; Nashville Predators; Tampa Bay Lightning; Ilves; Dallas Stars; Buffalo Sabres; Arizona Coyotes; Rögle BK; HC Davos; Torpedo Nizhny Novgorod; Jokerit; Vienna Capitals
- National team: Sweden
- NHL draft: 207th overall, 2008; Nashville Predators
- Playing career: 2007–present

Anders Lindbäck (born 3 May 1988) is a Swedish professional ice hockey goaltender who currently plays for Färjestad BK in the Swedish Hockey League (SHL). He has previously played for the Nashville Predators, Tampa Bay Lightning, Dallas Stars, Buffalo Sabres and Arizona Coyotes in the National Hockey League (NHL).

== Playing career ==
=== Junior ===
Lindbäck began his career with the Junior 18 Brynäs IF team in 2003 and played his first elite game in 2006. He was loaned out to the Uppsala-based team Almtuna IS of HockeyAllsvenskan for the duration of the 2007–08 season.

=== Professional ===
Lindbäck was drafted in the seventh round of the 2008 NHL entry draft, 207th overall, by the Nashville Predators.

On 25 March 2009 Lindbäck signed a contract with Timrå IK with the intent to play for the team during the 2009–10 season.

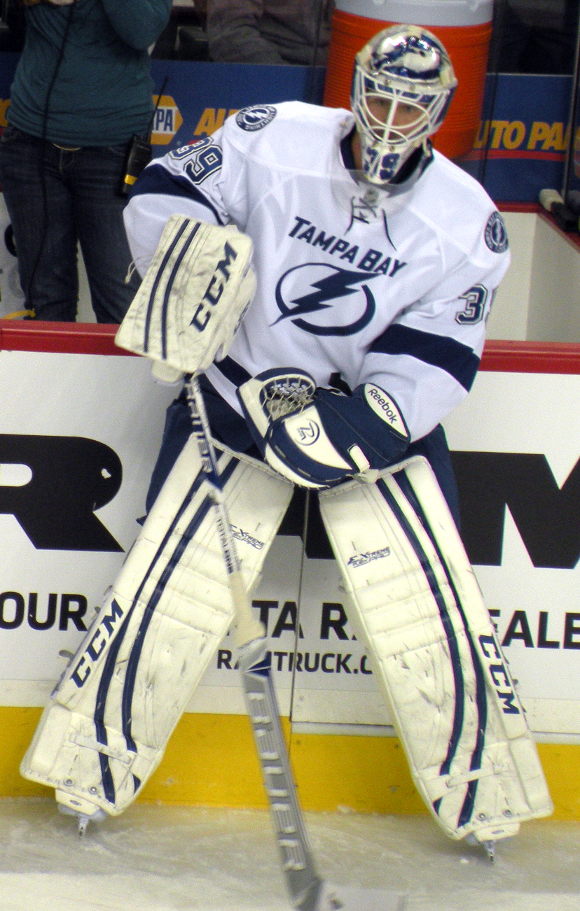
Lindbäck with the Lightning (2014)

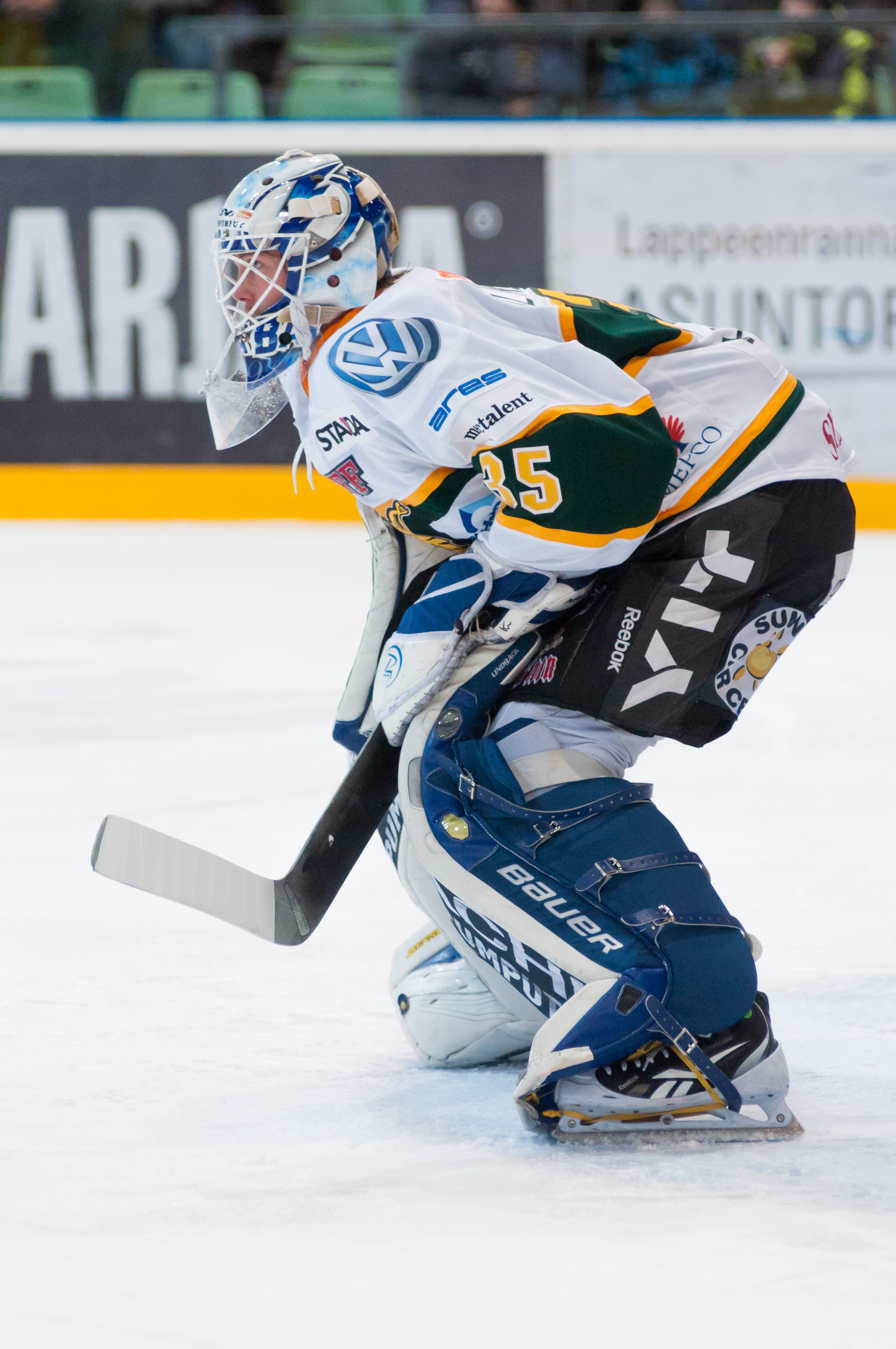
Lindbäck in 2012 playing for Ilves during the NHL lockout.

For the 2010–11 season, Lindbäck made the move to North America, and made his NHL debut on 9 October in relief of Pekka Rinne for the Nashville Predators against the Anaheim Ducks at Bridgestone Arena in Nashville. He recorded his first NHL shutout on 11 December against the Florida Panthers, then, just two days later on 13 December, Lindbäck recorded his second career shutout against the New York Islanders in back-to-back games.

During the 2012–13 NHL lockout, Lindbäck played for Ilves in the Finnish Liiga. He posted a .930 save percentage and 2.33 goals against average in 12 games.

On 15 June 2012, Lindbäck was traded to the Tampa Bay Lightning, along with Kyle Wilson and a seventh-round draft pick, for Sébastien Caron, two second-round draft picks in the 2012 NHL entry draft and a third-round draft pick in the 2013 NHL Entry Draft.

After two disappointing seasons with the Lightning organization, Lindbäck was not tendered a new contract and was released as a free agent. On 1 July 2014, he was signed to a one-year contract with the Dallas Stars.

Lindbäck played only 10 games in Dallas before being traded, along with a conditional third-round pick, to the Buffalo Sabres in exchange for fellow Swedish goaltender Jhonas Enroth. Lindbäck made his debut for the Sabres in a start on 3 March 2015, against his former team, the Tampa Bay Lightning.

With the Sabres looking in a different direction for their goaltending options, Lindbäck signed a one-year contract as a free agent with the Arizona Coyotes on 1 July 2015. After a third successive subpar season in the NHL with the Coyotes, Lindback remained a free agent over the following summer.

On 16 September 2016, it was announced that Lindbäck was invited to Professional Tryout contract with the New Jersey Devils. Following his participation in the Devils training camp, Lindback was released from his try-out. On 25 October 2016, Lindbäck agreed to a try-out with the Ontario Reign of the AHL, in sight of the backup role with affiliate, the Los Angeles Kings. He appeared in 4 games with the Reign, failing to impress before he was released on 19 November 2016.

Having returned to his native Sweden, Lindbäck agreed to a play in the top-flight SHL for the first time since 2010, signing a deal for the remainder of the 2016–17 season with Rögle BK on 14 December 2016. Assuming the starting role, he collected 7 wins in 23 games with Rögle BK missing the playoffs to enter a relegation battle. He won each of his four games in the post-season to maintain Rögle's status in the SHL.

On 1 July 2017, Lindbäck returned to his original club in the NHL, agreeing to a one-year, two-way contract with the Nashville Predators.

On 15 September 2018, Lindbäck signed a one-year contract with Davos of the Swiss National League (NL). In the 2018–19 season, he was unable to attain success with Davos, collecting just 12 wins in 31 games as Davos entered a relegation playoff.

At the conclusion of his contract, Lindbäck continued his journeyman career, accepting a one-year contract as a free agent with Russian club, Torpedo Nizhny Novgorod of the KHL, on 7 May 2019. In his debut KHL season in 2019–20, Lindbäck enjoyed a successful season with Torpedo, collecting 17 wins and posting a 2.39 goals against average.

On 5 May 2020, Lindbäck left Torpedo as a free agent and was signed to a one-year contract with Finnish KHL club, Jokerit. He made 28 appearances during his second season with Jokerit before the club withdrew from the KHL during the 2021–22 season due to the Russian invasion of Ukraine.

As a free agent, Lindbäck returned to his roots in agreeing to a three-year contract with his original SHL club, Brynäs IF, on 20 May 2022.

On 4 October 2024, after not having played for nine months, Lindbäck signed a six-week contract with the Vienna Capitals in the multi-state ICEHL as a temporary replacement for injured goaltender Tyler Parks. After posting a goals-against average of 3.29 and a save percentage of .895 in four games, the Capitals allowed his contract to expire.

On 4 February 2025, Lindbäck signed with SHL club Färjestad BK to serve as the team's third-string goaltender for the remainder of the 2024–25 season.

== International play ==
Medal record

Representing Sweden

Ice hockey

World Championship
Bronze medal – third place	2010 Germany	

Anders currently holds the record for shortest time played by any participant in the Ice Hockey World Championships. He played one second in Sweden's win against Germany in the 2010 bronze medal game.

== Personal life ==
Lindbäck was diagnosed with Adult-onset Still's disease months before he entered the 2008 NHL Draft, which made him get drafted so late despite his excellence. He is close friends with former teammate and fellow Swede Patric Hörnqvist.

Growing up in Gävle, Lindbäck has been a friend of Jacob Markström since childhood, and they both played for Brynäs IF during the 2008–09 season. As a result of Lindbäck's trade to Tampa Bay, they were playing for division rivals (Tampa Bay Lightning and Florida Panthers) between 2012 and 2014 until Markström's trade to the Vancouver Canucks.

== Career statistics ==
=== Regular season and playoffs ===
			Regular season									Playoffs
Season	Team	League	GP	W	L	OTL	MIN	GA	SO	GAA	SV%	GP	W	L	MIN	GA	SO	GAA	SV%
2003–04	Brynäs IF	J18	3	—	—	—	178	13	0	4.38	—	—	—	—	—	—	—	—	—
2004–05	Brynäs IF	J18	49	—	—	—	2,940	108	7	2.20	—	—	—	—	—	—	—	—	—
2005–06	Brynäs IF	J18	11	—	—	—	666	36	2	3.24	.891	—	—	—	—	—	—	—	—
2005–06	Brynäs IF	J20	5	—	—	—	257	7	2	1.64	.926	—	—	—	—	—	—	—	—
2006–07	Brynäs IF	J20	36	—	—	—	2,143	81	5	2.27	.905	3	—	—	180	6	0	2.00	.908
2007–08	Almtuna IS	Allsv	18	6	10	2	1,034	53	0	3.07	.905	—	—	—	—	—	—	—	—
2008–09	Brynäs IF	J20	3	—	—	—	179	7	0	2.35	.928	—	—	—	—	—	—	—	—
2008–09	Brynäs IF	SEL	24	12	10	1	1,332	57	1	2.57	.916	3	0	3	137	7	0	2.37	.916
2009–10	Timrå IK	SEL	42	18	16	8	2,538	104	3	2.46	.912	5	1	4	305	15	0	2.94	.900
2010–11	Nashville Predators	NHL	22	11	5	2	1,131	49	2	2.60	.915	1	0	0	13	0	0	0.00	1.000
2010–11	Milwaukee Admirals	AHL	4	2	2	0	241	11	0	2.73	.915	—	—	—	—	—	—	—	—
2011–12	Nashville Predators	NHL	16	5	8	0	792	32	0	2.42	.912	—	—	—	—	—	—	—	—
2011–12	Milwaukee Admirals	AHL	2	1	1	0	119	7	0	3.50	.879	—	—	—	—	—	—	—	—
2012–13	Ilves	SM-l	13	—	—	—	798	—	3	2.33	.930	—	—	—	—	—	—	—	—
2012–13	Tampa Bay Lightning	NHL	24	10	10	1	1,304	63	0	2.90	.902	—	—	—	—	—	—	—	—
2013–14	Tampa Bay Lightning	NHL	23	8	12	2	1,302	63	1	2.90	.891	4	0	3	215	14	0	3.92	.891
2013–14	Syracuse Crunch	AHL	2	1	1	0	117	3	1	1.54	.939	—	—	—	—	—	—	—	—
2014–15	Dallas Stars	NHL	10	2	8	0	517	32	0	3.71	.875	—	—	—	—	—	—	—	—
2014–15	Texas Stars	AHL	7	4	2	1	429	12	0	1.68	.946	—	—	—	—	—	—	—	—
2014–15	Buffalo Sabres	NHL	16	4	8	2	891	41	0	2.76	.924	—	—	—	—	—	—	—	—
2015–16	Arizona Coyotes	NHL	19	5	7	1	907	47	0	3.11	.894	—	—	—	—	—	—	—	—
2016–17	Ontario Reign	AHL	4	2	1	0	247	14	0	3.40	.870	—	—	—	—	—	—	—	—
2016–17	Rögle BK	SHL	23	7	15	0	1,344	59	0	2.63	.916	—	—	—	—	—	—	—	—
2017–18	Milwaukee Admirals	AHL	56	31	20	5	3,383	159	1	2.82	.908	—	—	—	—	—	—	—	—
2018–19	HC Davos	NL	31	12	17	0	1,830	98	0	3.21	.904	—	—	—	—	—	—	—	—
2019–20	Torpedo Nizhny Novgorod	KHL	36	17	17	0	1,980	79	2	2.39	.923	1	0	1	60	3	0	3.00	.897
2020–21	Jokerit	KHL	23	10	9	2	1,344	55	1	2.45	.919	4	0	4	255	13	0	3.06	.906
2021–22	Jokerit	KHL	28	15	10	1	1,622	58	2	2.15	.913	—	—	—	—	—	—	—	—
2022–23	Brynäs IF	SHL	35	15	19	0	1,995	93	2	2.80	.893	—	—	—	—	—	—	—	—
2023–24	Brynäs IF	Allsv	15	8	6	0	880	37	0	2.52	.889	—	—	—	—	—	—	—	—
SHL totals			124	52	60	9	7,210	313	6	2.61	.909	8	1	7	483	22	0	2.73	.906
NHL totals			130	45	58	8	6,845	327	3	2.87	.904	5	0	3	228	14	0	3.68	.890
KHL totals			87	42	36	3	4,946	192	5	2.33	.919	5	0	5	315	16	0	3.05	.905
