= Sébastien Caron =

Canadian ice hockey player (born 1980)

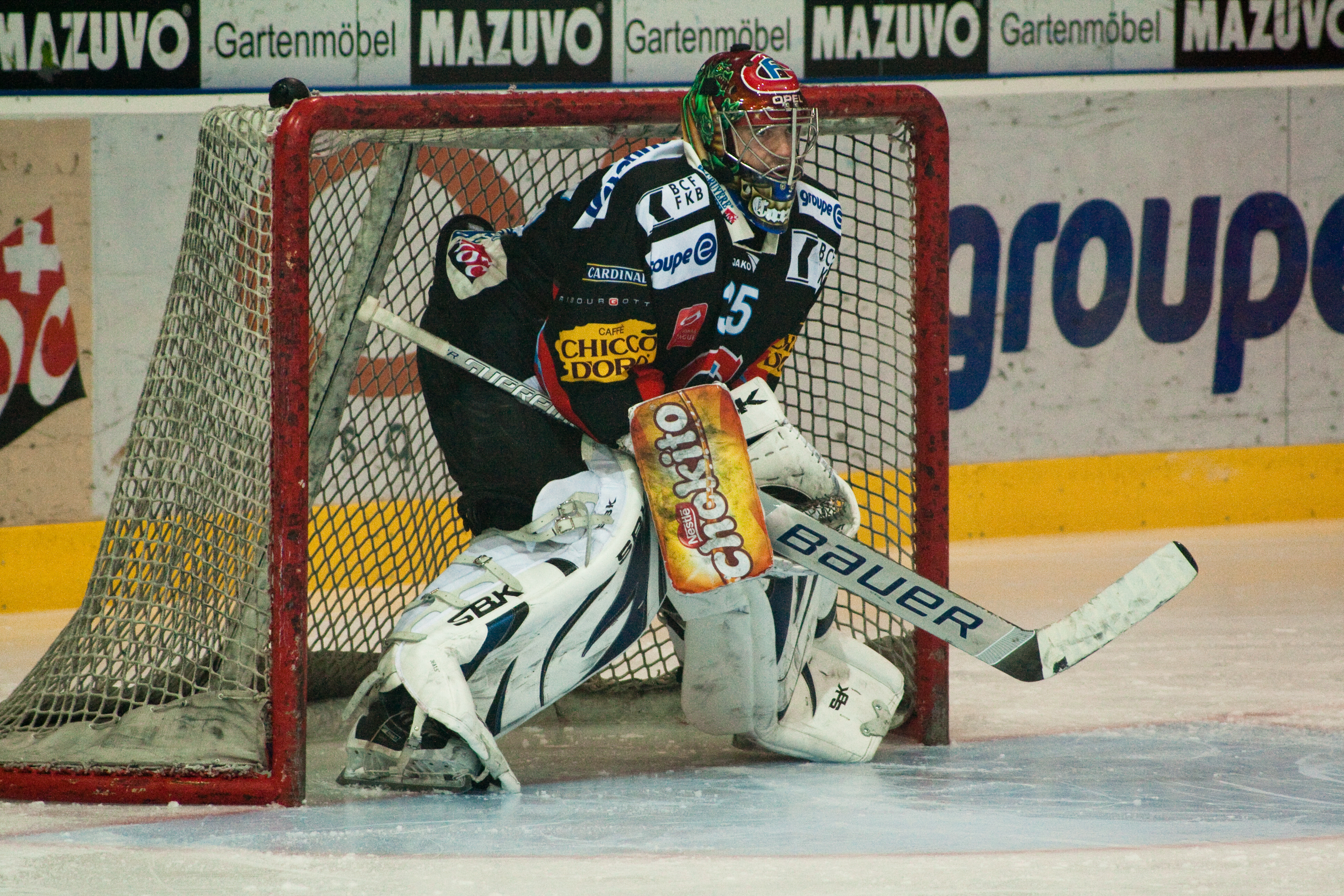
- Caron with HC Fribourg-Gottéron in 2010
- Born: June 25, 1980 (age 46) Amqui, Quebec, Canada
- Height: 6 ft 1 in (185 cm)
- Weight: 170 lb (77 kg; 12 st 2 lb)
- Position: Goaltender
- Caught: Left
- Played for: Pittsburgh Penguins; Chicago Blackhawks; Anaheim Ducks; HC Fribourg-Gottéron; Traktor Chelyabinsk; HC Lugano; Iserlohn Roosters; Tampa Bay Lightning; Hamburg Freezers
- NHL draft: 86th overall, 1999; Pittsburgh Penguins
- Playing career: 2000–2016

Sébastien Caron, born on June 25, 1980, is a Canadian former professional ice hockey goaltender who played in the National Hockey League (NHL). He last played for the defunct Hamburg Freezers of the then Deutsche Eishockey Liga (DEL).

== Playing career ==
As a youth, Caron played in the 1993 Quebec International Pee-Wee Hockey Tournament with a minor ice hockey team from Matapédia, Quebec.

Caron was a third-round pick, 86th overall, by the Pittsburgh Penguins in the 1999 NHL entry draft. During the 2005-06 season, in a game against the Philadelphia Flyers, Caron gained national attention through his great save against Brian Savage. The puck went off the left goal post, Savage then tried to tip the puck in the goal but Caron quickly scooped the puck up with his glove almost on the goal line. However, Caron was also known for allowing a 170-foot shot by Washington Capitals defenseman Ivan Majeský. He started the season as backup to Jocelyn Thibault and ended it as back-up to Marc-André Fleury. On June 25, 2006, Caron was bought out from the remaining year of his four-year contract with the Penguins.

During the 2007 playoffs, Caron served as a spare goaltender for the Anaheim Ducks. He was not called on to dress during the playoffs. Caron was included on the Stanley Cup winning picture, and has a Stanley Cup ring; however, because he only played one regular season game, he did not qualify to have his name engraved on the Stanley Cup. On April 1, 2010, Caron was signed by the Philadelphia Flyers. He was the seventh goaltender acquired by the Flyers' for the 2009–10 NHL season. Caron was never in net for Philadelphia during his short visit.

On August 23, 2010, Caron was signed by Traktor Chelyabinsk. He also played for HC Lugano of Swiss National League A, and the Iserlohn Roosters in Germany.

On March 19, 2012, he signed with the Tampa Bay Lightning of the National Hockey League.

On June 15, 2012, Caron was traded along with two second-round draft picks in the 2012 NHL Entry Draft and a third-round draft pick in the 2013 NHL Entry Draft to the Nashville Predators for goalie Anders Lindbäck, Kyle Wilson, and a seventh-round draft pick.

He signed with the Iserlohn Roosters of the German top flight Deutsche Eishockey Liga (DEL) for the 2012–13 season and remained with the team until October 2013, when he transferred to fellow DEL club Hamburg Freezers. In September 2015, Caron underwent back surgery and had to sit out three months.

== Career statistics ==
=== Regular season and playoffs ===
			Regular season										Playoffs
Season	Team	League	GP	W	L	T	OTL	MIN	GA	SO	GAA	SV%	GP	W	L	MIN	GA	SO	GAA	SV%
1997–98	TGV Pentagone	QMAAA	17	—	—	—	—	762	48	1	2.84	—	—	—	—	—	—	—	—	—
1998–99	Rimouski Océanic	QMJHL	30	13	10	3	—	1577	85	0	3.23	.912	2	1	0	68	0	0	0.00	1.000
1999–00	Rimouski Océanic	QMJHL	54	38	11	3	—	3040	179	1	3.53	.896	14	12	2	828	50	0	3.62	.900
2000–01	Wilkes–Barre/Scranton Penguins	AHL	30	12	14	3	—	1746	103	4	3.54	.882	—	—	—	—	—	—	—	—
2001–02	Wilkes–Barre/Scranton Penguins	AHL	46	14	22	8	—	2671	139	1	3.12	.903	—	—	—	—	—	—	—	—
2002–03	Wilkes–Barre/Scranton Penguins	AHL	27	12	14	1	—	1561	81	1	3.11	.904	—	—	—	—	—	—	—	—
2002–03	Pittsburgh Penguins	NHL	24	7	14	2	—	1408	62	2	2.64	.916	—	—	—	—	—	—	—	—
2003–04	Pittsburgh Penguins	NHL	40	9	24	5	—	2213	138	1	3.74	.883	—	—	—	—	—	—	—	—
2003–04	Wilkes–Barre/Scranton Penguins	AHL	14	7	3	4	—	811	26	2	1.92	.930	7	3	4	395	23	0	3.49	.850
2004–05	Saguenay Fjord	LNAH	18	—	—	—	—	—	—	—	—	—	—	—	—	—	—	—	—	—
2004–05	Sorel–Tracy Mission	LNAH	24	—	—	—	—	—	—	—	—	—	4	—	—	—	—	—	5.12	.829
2005–06	Pittsburgh Penguins	NHL	26	8	9	—	5	1312	87	1	3.98	.881	—	—	—	—	—	—	—	—
2005–06	Wilkes–Barre/Scranton Penguins	AHL	6	3	3	—	0	357	7	2	1.18	.954	—	—	—	—	—	—	—	—
2006–07	Norfolk Admirals	AHL	9	4	4	—	0	506	34	0	4.03	.868	—	—	—	—	—	—	—	—
2006–07	Chicago Blackhawks	NHL	1	1	0	—	0	60	1	0	1.00	.960	—	—	—	—	—	—	—	—
2006–07	Portland Pirates	AHL	17	7	6	—	4	1025	40	0	2.34	.910	—	—	—	—	—	—	—	—
2006–07	Anaheim Ducks	NHL	1	0	0	—	0	28	1	0	2.12	.833	—	—	—	—	—	—	—	—
2007–08	HC Fribourg–Gottéron	NLA	48	24	24	—	0	2851	144	5	3.03	.923	7	4	3	441	21	0	2.86	.923
2008–09	HC Fribourg–Gottéron	NLA	39	21	17	—	0	2265	101	4	2.68	.912	11	7	3	668	19	2	1.71	.947
2009–10	HC Fribourg–Gottéron	NLA	46	20	26	—	0	2739	142	1	3.11	.915	7	3	4	429	23	0	3.22	.911
2010–11	Traktor Chelyabinsk	KHL	12	3	7	—	0	655	40	0	3.66	.867	—	—	—	—	—	—	—	—
2010–11	HC Lugano	NLA	14	7	7	—	0	846	36	2	2.55	.910	—	—	—	—	—	—	—	—
2011–12	Iserlohn Roosters	DEL	49	25	23	—	0	2947	126	5	2.57	.932	2	0	2	117	9	0	4.62	.889
2011–12	Tampa Bay Lightning	NHL	3	1	1	—	0	135	7	0	3.11	.877	—	—	—	—	—	—	—	—
2012–13	Iserlohn Roosters	DEL	47	18	28	—	0	2692	135	2	3.01	.920	—	—	—	—	—	—	—	—
2013–14	Iserlohn Roosters	DEL	4	2	2	—	0	239	14	1	3.52	.890	—	—	—	—	—	—	—	—
2013–14	Hamburg Freezers	DEL	24	17	7	—	0	1439	40	3	1.67	.944	7	3	4	416	17	1	2.45	.922
2014–15	Hamburg Freezers	DEL	33	20	11	—	0	1906	79	3	2.49	.920	7	3	4	416	18	1	2.59	.900
2015–16	Hamburg Freezers	DEL	12	5	7	—	0	658	41	0	3.74	.880	—	—	—	—	—	—	—	—
DEL totals			169	87	78	—	0	9881	435	14	2.64	—	16	6	10	949	44	2	2.78	—
NHL totals			95	26	48	7	5	5156	296	4	3.44	.892	—	—	—	—	—	—	—	—

== Awards and honours ==
Awards	Year	
CHL
Memorial Cup (Rimouski Océanic)	2000	
Memorial Cup All-Star Team	2000	
Hap Emms Memorial Trophy	2000	
NHL
All-Rookie Team	2003	2007 Stanley Cup Champion

== Transactions ==
- June 26, 1999 – Drafted by Pittsburgh in the fourth round (86th overall) of the 1999 Entry Draft.
- June 25, 2006 – Caron's contract bought out by the Pittsburgh Penguins.
- July 27, 2006 – Caron signed with the Chicago Blackhawks.
- December 29, 2006 – Traded along with Matt Keith and Chris Durno to Anaheim Ducks for P. A. Parenteau and Bruno St. Jacques.
- April 1, 2010 – Signed by the Philadelphia Flyers.
- August 23, 2010 – Signed by Traktor Chelyabinsk (KHL).
- March 19, 2012 – Signed by the Tampa Bay Lightning to a one-year, one-way contract.
- June 15, 2012 – Traded to the Nashville Predators, along with 3 draft picks for Kyle Wilson, Anders Lindbäck, and one draft pick.
