= 2000 Memorial Cup =

Canadian junior men's ice hockey championship

2000 Mastercard Memorial Cup

Tournament details
- Venue(s): Halifax Metro Centre; Halifax, Nova Scotia
- Dates: May 20–28, 2000
- Teams: 4
- Host team: Halifax Mooseheads (QMJHL)
- TV partner(s): CTV, CTV Sportsnet

Final positions
- Champions: Rimouski Océanic (QMJHL) (1st title)

Tournament statistics
- Games played: 8
- Attendance: 79,877 (9,985 per game)

The Memorial Cup trophy

The 2000 Memorial Cup occurred May 20–28 at the Halifax Metro Centre in Halifax, Nova Scotia. It was the 82nd annual Memorial Cup competition and determined the major junior ice hockey champion of the Canadian Hockey League (CHL). It featured the host team, the Halifax Mooseheads as well as the winners of the Ontario Hockey League, Quebec Major Junior Hockey League and the Western Hockey League which were the Barrie Colts, Rimouski Océanic and the Kootenay Ice respectively. The 2000 Memorial Cup was the first ever to be played in Atlantic Canada. The Rimouski Océanic won their first Memorial Cup, beating the Barrie Colts in the final. The Colts in particular made the 2000 Memorial Cup a controversial one, due to the presence of numerous players on their team who were clients of the rogue sports agent David Frost, including future murder-for-hire suspect Mike Danton.

== Round-robin standings ==
Pos	Team	Pld	W	L	GF	GA
1	Rimouski Océanic (QMJHL)	3	3	0	15	6
2	Halifax Mooseheads (host)	3	2	1	15	8
3	Barrie Colts (OHL)	3	1	2	7	14
4	Kootenay Ice (WHL)	3	0	3	4	13

== Scores ==
Round Robin

- May 20 Halifax 5 Barrie 2
- May 21 Rimouski 3 Kootenay 1
- May 22 Halifax 7 Kootenay 1
- May 23 Rimouski 7 Barrie 2
- May 24 Barrie 3 Kootenay 2 (2OT)
- May 25 Rimouski 5 Halifax 3

Semi-final

- May 27: Barrie 6 Halifax 3

Final

- May 28: Rimouski 6 Barrie 2

== Barrie Colts controversy ==
The Barrie Colts, representing the Ontario Hockey League at the tournament was known more for the erratic behaviour of the team and most notably the "Brampton Boys", a reference to the Toronto suburban city of Brampton. The Brampton Boys were under the guidance and influence of their former coach and erstwhile sports agent David Frost. The Brampton Boys included Ryan Barnes, Shawn Cation, captain Sheldon Keefe and future convicted felon Mike Jefferson (aka Mike Danton).

The Brampton Boys led a walkout during a customary tournament team banquet and refused to shake hands with CHL commissioner David Branch in ceremonial face-offs. Rookie Matt Passfield was fined after it was revealed he scalped his own Memorial Cup tickets. The team failed to stand at the blue line during introductions, choosing instead to skate around their own zone. Head coach Bill Stewart added more controversy by shoving the bench back during the opening game, in order to stand in front of his own players, earning a bench minor for unsportsmanlike conduct after screaming at an official and by ordering his team to do a skate around, while a Joe Canadian skit was taking place on the ice. Jefferson publicly called out the two elite players of the QMJHL, stating that he wanted to slash Halifax Mooseheads forward Ramzi Abid (158 points in regular season) in the face and claiming that Rimouski Océanic forward/CHL Player of the Year winner Brad Richards (186 points) would be a complete unknown if he didn't play in the QMJHL and would not last five games in the OHL.

The Colts reached the Memorial Cup championship game, where they were defeated 6–2 by the Oceanic and while Jefferson shook most of the hands of the Oceanic players, he refused to shake Richards' hand after he had been named tournament MVP. Jefferson, Keefe and head coach Stewart also notoriously walked out of the Halifax Metro Centre after the final without conducting any interviews with the media. The behaviour of the Colts, most notably the Brampton Boys, drew the ire of many in hockey circles, citing their behaviour made the team appear to be boorish oafs and sore losers. The Colts recorded $10,000 worth of fines as a result of the team's conduct at the tournament.

== Winning roster ==
Jean-Francois Babin, Jonathan Beaulieu, Thatcher Bell, Jean-Philippe Briere, Jan Philippe Cadieux, Sebastien Caron, Alexis Castonguay, Ronnie DeContie, Aaron Johnson, Juraj Kolnik, Jacques Lariviere, Brent MacLellan, Benoit Martin, Michel Ouellet, Michel Periard, Nicolas Pilote, Nicholas Poirier, Brad Richards, Joe Rullier, Eric Salvail, Shawn Scanzano, Alexandre Tremblay, Rene Vydareny. Coach: Doris Labonte

== Scoring leaders ==
1. Ramzi Abid, HAL, (6g 4a) 10p
2. Juraj Kolnik, RIM, (5g 5a) 10p
3. Brad Richards, RIM, (4g 6a) 10p
4. Jasmin Gelinas, HAL, (3g 5a) 8p
5. Michel Periard, RIM, (2g 6a) 8p
6. Brandon Reid, HAL, (1g 6a) 7p
7. Jonathan Beaulieu, RIM, (4g 2a) 6p
8. Benoit Dusablon, HAL, (3g 3a) 6p
9. Benoit Martin, RIM, (3g 2a) 5p
10. Sheldon Keefe, BAR, (2g 3a) 5p

== Goaltending leaders ==
1. Sebastien Caron, RIM (2.00 GAA, .952 Pct)
2. Pascal Leclaire, HFX (3.14 GAA, .915 Pct)
3. Dan Blackburn, KOO (4.09 GAA, .892 Pct)
4. Brian Finley, BAR (4.42 GAA, .894 Pct)

== Award winners ==
- Stafford Smythe Memorial Trophy (MVP): Brad Richards, Rimouski
- George Parsons Trophy (Sportsmanship): Brandon Reid, Halifax
- Hap Emms Memorial Trophy (Goaltender): Sebastien Caron, Rimouski
- Ed Chynoweth Trophy (Leading Scorer): Ramzi Abid, Halifax

All-star team

- Goal - Sebastien Caron, Rimouski
- Defence - Michel Periard, Rimouski, Eric Reitz, Barrie
- Forward - Brad Richards, Rimouski, Juraj Kolnik, Rimouski, Sheldon Keefe, Barrie
