= Barrie Colts =

Ontario Hockey League team in Barrie

- City: Barrie, Ontario
- League: Ontario Hockey League
- Conference: Eastern
- Division: Central
- Founded: 1946 (Jr. B.); May 6, 1995 (OHL)
- Home arena: Sadlon Arena
- Colours: Navy blue, yellow, red and white
- General manager: Marty Williamson
- Head coach: Dylan Smoskowitz
- Website: www.barriecolts.com

Current uniform

The Barrie Colts are a junior ice hockey team in Ontario Hockey League (OHL), based in Barrie, Ontario, Canada. The Colts play home games at the Sadlon Arena. The Colts joined the OHL in 1995, and previously competed at lower levels of junior ice hockey. During the 1999–2000 OHL season, the Colts won the J. Ross Robertson Cup and participated in the 2000 Memorial Cup.

== Championships ==
OHL

Memorial Cup

- 1999–2000—Finalists vs. Rimouski Océanic

J. Ross Robertson Cup Ontario Hockey League Championship — 1 Championship, 4 Finalists

- 1999–2000—Champions vs. Plymouth Whalers
- 2001–02—Finalists vs. Erie Otters
- 2009–10—Finalists vs. Windsor Spitfires
- 2012–13—Finalists vs. London Knights
- 2025–26—Finalists vs. Kitchener Rangers

Bobby Orr Trophy Eastern Conference Championship — 5 Championships, 3 Finalists

- 1999–2000—Champions vs. Belleville Bulls
- 2001–02—Champions vs. Toronto St. Michael's Majors
- 2005–06—Finalists vs. Peterborough Petes
- 2009–10—Champions vs. Mississauga St. Michael's Majors
- 2012–13—Champions vs. Belleville Bulls
- 2015–16—Finalists vs. Niagara IceDogs
- 2024–25—Finalists vs. Oshawa Generals
- 2025–26—Champions vs. Brantford Bulldogs

Emms Trophy Central Division title—9 Championships

- 1998–99 — 105 points (First in Eastern Conference)
- 1999–2000 — 93 points (First in Eastern Conference)
- 2006–07 — 97 points (First in Eastern Conference)
- 2009–10 — 116 points (First in OHL)
- 2012–13 — 92 points (Second in Eastern Conference)
- 2014–15 — 85 points (Second in Eastern Conference)
- 2015–16 — 89 points (Second in Eastern Conference)
- 2017–18 — 89 points (Second in Eastern Conference)
- 2024–25 — 88 points (Second in Eastern Conference)
- 2025–26 — 99 points (Second in Eastern Conference)

Hamilton Spectator Trophy—1 Championship Best Record in the League

- 2009–10,—116 points

OHA Jr. B

Sutherland Cup Junior 'B' Championship

- 1934–35, 1992–93

Division titles Central Junior 'B'

- 1984–85, 1987–88, 1988–89, 1989–90, 1992–93

== Coaches ==
Bert Templeton was the first coach for the OHL Colts. Templeton was awarded the OHL Executive of the Year in 1995–96 for his role as general manager. Templeton built the inaugural team of the Barrie Colts, who became the first OHL expansion franchise to make the playoffs in its first season.

List of coaches (multiple seasons in parentheses):

- 1995–1999 – Bert Templeton (4)
- 1999–2000 – Bill Stewart
- 2000–2004 – Bud Stefanski (4)
- 2004–2010 – Marty Williamson (6)
- 2010–2019 – Dale Hawerchuk (9)
- 2019–2020 – Warren Rychel (interim)
- 2020 – Todd Miller (interim)
- 2021–2025 – Marty Williamson (4)
- 2025–present – Dylan Smoskowitz

== General managers ==
List of general managers:

- 1995–1999 – Bert Templeton
- 1999–2000 – Bill Stewart
- 2000–2005 – Mike McCann
- 2005–2010 – Greg Carrigan
- 2011–2021 – Jason Ford
- 2021–present – Marty Williamson

== Players ==
=== OHL award winners ===
List of OHL award winners:

- 1995 – Daniel Tkaczuk – Jack Ferguson Award (First overall draft selection)
- 1998–99 – Brian Finley – OHL Goaltender of the Year; Wayne Gretzky 99 Award (Playoffs MVP)
- 1998–99 – Sheldon Keefe – Emms Family Award (Rookie of the year)
- 1999–2000 – Sheldon Keefe – Eddie Powers Memorial Trophy (Scoring champion); Jim Mahon Memorial Trophy (Top Scoring right winger)
- 2000 – Erik Reitz and Sheldon Keefe – Memorial Cup All-Star Team
- 2001–02 – Erik Reitz – Max Kaminsky Trophy (Most outstanding defenceman)
- 2003–04 – Paulo Colaiacovo – OHL Goaltender of the Year
- 2003–04 – Bryan Little – Emms Family Award (Rookie of the year)
- 2009–10 – Bryan Cameron – Leo Lalonde Memorial Trophy (Overage player of the year)
- 2011 – Aaron Ekblad – Jack Ferguson Award (First overall draft selection)
- 2011–12 – Aaron Ekblad – Emms Family Award (Rookie of the year)
- 2013–14 – Aaron Ekblad – Max Kaminsky Trophy (Most outstanding defenceman)
- 2014–15 – Joseph Blandisi – Leo Lalonde Memorial Trophy (Overage player of the year)
- 2015–16 – Kevin Labanc – Eddie Powers Memorial Trophy (Scoring champion); Jim Mahon Memorial Trophy (Top scoring right winger); Leo Lalonde Memorial Trophy (Overage player of the year)
- 2015–16 – Michael Webster – Mickey Renaud Captain's Trophy (Leadership award)
- 2015–16 – Mackenzie Blackwood – OHL Goaltender of the Year
- 2017 – Ryan Suzuki – Jack Ferguson Award (First overall draft selection)
- 2017–18 – Aaron Luchuk – Eddie Powers Memorial Trophy (Scoring champion); Leo Lalonde Memorial Trophy (Overage player of the year)
- 2017–18 – Andrei Svechnikov – Emms Family Award (Rookie of the year)
- 2022–23 – Evan Vierling – William Hanley Trophy (Most Sportsmanlike Player)
- 2025–26 – Cole Beaudoin – William Hanley Trophy (Most Sportsmanlike Player)
- 2025–26 – Kashawn Aitcheson – Max Kaminsky Trophy (Most outstanding defenceman)
- 2025–26 – Brad Gardiner – Roger Neilson Memorial Award (Top Academic Post-Secondary student)

=== CHL award winners ===
List of CHL award winners:

- 2017–2018 – Andrei Svechnikov – CHL Top Draft Prospect Award
- 2022–2023 – Evan Vierling – CHL Sportsman of the Year Award
- 2025–2026 – Cole Beaudoin – CHL Sportsman of the Year Award

=== NHL alumni ===
As of the 2026–27 NHL season, there were 75 Barrie Colts alumni who have played in the National Hockey League: 64 from the OHL Colts, and 11 from the Junior B Colts.

Junior B Colts

- Drake Berehowsky
- Shayne Corson
- Bruce Gardiner
- Mike Hoffman
- John Madden
- Mike Prokopec
- Craig Rivet
- Darren Rumble
- Darrin Shannon
- Darryl Shannon
- Shayne Stevenson

OHL Colts

- Rasmus Andersson
- Andreas Athanasiou
- Darren Archibald
- Ryan Barnes
- Cole Beaudoin
- Mackenzie Blackwood
- Joseph Blandisi
- Darryl Bootland
- T. J. Brodie
- Evan Brophey
- Brad Brown
- Jan Bulis
- Alexander Burmistrov
- Ethan Cardwell
- Brandt Clarke
- Kyle Clifford
- Richard Clune
- Jeff Cowan
- B. J. Crombeen
- Mike Danton
- Stefan Della Rovere
- Jake Dotchin
- Curtis Douglas
- Aaron Ekblad
- Brian Finley
- Tyson Foerster
- Daniel Girardi
- Jet Greaves
- Hunter Haight
- Ryan Hamilton
- Ben Harpur
- Michael Hutchinson
- Sheldon Keefe
- Kevin Labanc
- Dan LaCosta
- Brian Lashoff
- Brendan Lemieux
- Bryan Little
- Andrew Mangiapane
- Mike Minard
- Oskar Olausson
- Adam Payerl
- Tanner Pearson
- Brendan Perlini
- Jakub Petruzalek
- Alex Pietrangelo
- Dalton Prout
- Eric Reitz
- Zac Rinaldo
- Mark Scheifele
- Michael Sgarbossa
- Denis Shvidki
- Arturs Silovs
- Martin Skoula
- Givani Smith
- Nick Smith
- Ryan Strome
- Ryan Suzuki
- Andrei Svechnikov
- Joey Tenute
- Daniel Tkaczuk
- Tyler Tucker
- Alexander Volchkov
- Mike Weber

=== Team captains ===
List of captains with the number of seasons in parentheses.

- 1995–96 – Brad Brown (1)
- 1995–96 – Jeff Cowan (1)
- 1996–99 – Daniel Tkaczuk (3)
- 1999–2000 – Sheldon Keefe (1)
- 2000–01 – Matt Dzieduszycki (1)
- 2001–02 – Eric Reitz (1)
- 2002–04 – Jeremy Swanson (2)
- 2004–05 – B. J. Crombeen (1)
- 2005–07 – Bryan Little (2)
- 2007–08 – Tomas Marcinko (1)
- 2008–10 – Stefan Della Rovere (2)
- 2010–11 – Dalton Prout (1)
- 2011–12 – Colin Behenna (1)
- 2012–13 – Ryan O'Connor (1)
- 2013–14 – Aaron Ekblad (1)
- 2014–15 – Joseph Blandisi (1)
- 2015–16 – Michael Webster (1)
- 2016–17 – Cordell James (1)
- 2017–19 – Justin Murray (2)
- 2019–20 – Jason Willms (1)
- 2019–20 – Luke Bignell (0.5)
- 2021–23 – Brandt Clarke (2.5)
- 2022–23 – Declan McDonnell (0.5)
- 2023–24 – Connor Punnett (0.5)
- 2024–25 – Beau Jelsma (1.5)
- 2025–26 – Cole Beaudoin (1)
- 2025–26 – Kashawn Aitcheson (1)
- 2026 – Evan Passmore (0.5)

=== Retired numbers ===
The Colts have retired three numbers in its history: Bryan Little (18), the franchise's all-time points leader; Kyle Clifford (13), a two-time Stanley Cup champion in 2012 & 2014; and Dale Hawerchuk (10), the team's Head coach for nine seasons.

Barrie Colts retired jersey numbers
No.	Player	Position	Career	Date of retirement
10	Dale Hawerchuk	Head coach	2010–2019	October 8, 2022
13	Kyle Clifford	LW/RW	2007–2010	February 27, 2025
18	Bryan Little	C	2003–2007	January 25, 2020

== Season-by-season results ==
Regular season and playoffs results:

- 1960s–1978 (Mid-Ontario Junior B Hockey League)
- 1978–1993 (Central Junior B Hockey League)
- 1993–1995 (Ontario Provincial Junior A Hockey League)
- 1995–present (Ontario Hockey League)

Legend: GP = Games played, W = Wins, L = Losses, T = Ties, OTL = Overtime losses, SL = Shoot-out losses, Pts = Points, GF = Goals for, GA = Goals against

Memorial Cup champions	OHL champions	OHL finalists

Season	Regular season											Playoffs
Season	GP	W	L	T	OTL	SOL	Pts	Pct	GF	GA	Finish	Playoffs
1970–71	33	14	15	4	–	–	32	0.485	168	179	6th MOJBHL	
1971–72	40	19	17	4	–	–	42	0.525	–	–	4th MOJBHL	
1972–73	40	19	16	5	–	–	43	0.538	205	194	3rd MOJBHL	
1973–74	40	24	13	3	–	–	51	0.638	249	177	3rd MOJBHL	
1974–75	40	11	25	4	–	–	26	0.325	179	235	5th MOJBHL	
1975–76	36	17	13	6	–	–	40	0.556	142	138	2nd MOJBHL	
1976–77	40	16	19	5	–	–	37	0.463	172	176	4th MOJBHL	
1977–78	32	17	10	5	–	–	39	0.609	176	145	2nd MOJBHL	
Colts transferred to the Central Junior B Hockey League
1978–79	44	15	27	2	–	–	32	0.364	–	–	10th CJBHL	
1979–80	44	14	21	9	–	–	37	0.420	219	261	8th CJBHL	
1980–81	44	10	29	5	–	–	25	0.284	215	296	11th CJBHL	
1981–82	40	19	20	1	–	–	39	0.488	239	233	6th CJBHL	
1982–83	42	22	14	6	–	–	50	0.595	222	177	4th CJBHL	
1983–84	40	22	12	6	–	–	50	0.625	183	160	3rd CJBHL	
1984–85	40	23	10	7	–	–	53	0.663	231	165	1st CJBHL	
1985–86	48	28	15	5	–	–	61	0.635	273	197	1st CJBHL	
1986–87	42	33	6	3	–	–	69	0.821	282	120	1st CJBHL	
1987–88	44	38	1	5	–	–	81	0.920	325	127	1st CJBHL	
1988–89	42	27	12	3	–	–	57	0.679	269	175	4th CJBHL	
1989–90	42	32	4	6	–	–	70	0.833	241	125	1st CJBHL	
1990–91	42	21	17	4	–	–	46	0.548	178	148	7th CJBHL	
1991–92	42	37	1	4	–	–	78	0.929	319	129	1st CJBHL	
1992–93	48	47	0	1	–	–	95	0.990	436	145	1st CJBHL	Won Sutherland Cup (Kitchener Dutchmen) 4–0
Colts transferred to the Ontario Provincial Junior A Hockey League
1993–94	40	22	16	2	–	–	47	0.588	175	145	8th OPJHL	
1994–95	48	34	8	6	–	–	74	0.771	285	155	2nd OPJHL	
Colts admitted to the Ontario Hockey League as an expansion franchise
1995–96	66	28	31	7	–	–	63	0.477	258	266	5th Central	Lost division quarterfinals (Kitchener Rangers) 4–3
1996–97	66	33	23	10	–	–	76	0.576	272	236	3rd Central	Won division quarterfinals (Owen Sound Platers) 4–0; Lost quarterfinals (Ottawa 67's) 4–1
1997–98	66	38	23	5	–	–	81	0.614	236	215	2nd Central	Lost division quarterfinals (Sudbury Wolves) 4–2
1998–99	68	49	12	6	–	1	105	0.765	343	192	1st Central	Won conference quarterfinals (Kingston Frontenacs) 4–1; Lost conference semifinals (Oshawa Generals) 4–3
1999–2000	68	43	18	6	1	–	93	0.676	306	212	1st Central	Won conference quarterfinals (North Bay Centennials) 4–2; Won conference semifinals (Sudbury Wolves) 4–3; Won conference finals (Belleville Bulls) 4–1; Won OHL finals (Plymouth Whalers) 4–3; Lost 2000 Memorial Cup final (Rimouski Oceanic) 6–2
2000–01	68	29	28	7	4	–	69	0.478	214	230	4th Central	Lost conference quarterfinals (Sudbury Wolves) 4–1
2001–02	68	38	19	9	2	–	87	0.625	226	192	2nd Central	Won conference quarterfinals (Sudbury Wolves) 4–1; Won conference semifinals (Belleville Bulls) 4–2; Won conference finals (Toronto St. Michael's Majors) 4–0; Lost OHL finals (Erie Otters) 4–1
2002–03	68	29	26	4	9	–	71	0.456	228	223	3rd Central	Lost conference quarterfinals (Brampton Battalion) 4–2
2003–04	68	31	21	12	4	–	78	0.544	196	171	3rd Central	Won conference quarterfinals (Kingston Frontenacs) 4–1; Lost conference semifinals (Mississauga IceDogs) 4–3
2004–05	68	33	23	9	3	–	78	0.551	232	210	2nd Central	Lost conference quarterfinals (Ottawa 67's) 4–2
2005–06	68	43	21	–	1	3	90	0.662	258	194	2nd Central	Won conference quarterfinals (Toronto St. Michael's Majors) 4–0; Won conference semifinals (Brampton Battalion) 4–1; Lost conference finals (Peterborough Petes) 4–1
2006–07	68	48	19	–	0	1	97	0.713	273	193	1st Central	Won conference quarterfinals (Brampton Battalion) 4–0; Lost conference semifinals (Sudbury Wolves) 4–0
2007–08	68	28	34	–	3	3	62	0.456	185	223	4th Central	Won conference quarterfinals (Brampton Battalion) 4–1; Lost conference semifinals (Belleville Bulls) 4–0
2008–09	68	30	33	–	3	2	65	0.478	214	207	3rd Central	Lost conference quarterfinals (Mississauga St. Michael's Majors) 4–1
2009–10	68	57	9	–	0	2	116	0.853	327	186	1st Central	Won conference quarterfinals (Sudbury Wolves) 4–0; Won conference semifinals (Brampton Battalion) 4–0; Won conference finals (Mississauga St. Michael's Majors) 4–1; Lost OHL finals (Windsor Spitfires) 4–0
2010–11	68	15	49	–	2	2	34	0.250	232	352	5th Central	Did not qualify
2011–12	68	40	23	–	3	2	85	0.625	248	210	2nd Central	Won conference quarterfinals (Mississauga St. Michael's Majors) 4–2; Lost conference semifinals (Ottawa 67's) 4–3
2012–13	68	44	20	–	2	2	92	0.676	245	185	1st Central	Won conference quarterfinals (Kingston Frontenacs) 4–0; Won conference semifinals (Oshawa Generals) 4–0; Won conference finals (Belleville Bulls) 4–3; Lost OHL finals (London Knights) 4–3
2013–14	68	37	28	–	1	2	77	0.566	266	218	2nd Central	Won conference quarterfinals (Sudbury Wolves) 4–1; Lost conference semifinals (North Bay Battalion) 4–2
2014–15	68	41	24	–	1	2	85	0.625	278	227	1st Central	Won conference quarterfinals (Belleville Bulls) 4–0; Lost conference semifinals (North Bay Battalion) 4–1
2015–16	68	43	22	–	0	3	89	0.654	295	207	1st Central	Won conference quarterfinals (Mississauga Steelheads) 4–3; Won conference semifinals (North Bay Battalion) 4–0; Lost conference finals (Niagara IceDogs) 4–0
2016–17	68	17	44	–	6	1	41	0.301	192	291	5th Central	Did not qualify
2017–18	68	42	21	–	4	1	89	0.654	297	229	1st Central	Won conference quarterfinals (Mississauga Steelheads) 4–2; Lost conference semifinals (Kingston Frontenacs) 4–2
2018–19	68	26	38	–	3	1	56	0.412	221	245	5th Central	Did not qualify
2019–20	63	29	28	–	4	2	64	0.508	220	261	2nd Central	Playoffs cancelled due to the COVID-19 pandemic
2020–21	Season cancelled due to the COVID-19 pandemic											
2021–22	68	34	27	–	6	1	75	0.551	245	236	3rd Central	Lost conference quarterfinals (Mississauga Steelheads) 4–2
2022–23	68	42	17	–	6	3	93	0.684	284	239	2nd Central	Won conference quarterfinals (Hamilton Bulldogs) 4–2; Lost conference semifinals (North Bay Battalion) 4–3
2023–24	68	28	36	–	4	0	60	0.441	234	283	4th Central	Lost conference quarterfinals (Oshawa Generals) 4–2
2024–25	68	42	22	–	2	2	88	0.647	250	219	1st Central	Won conference quarterfinals (Niagara IceDogs) 4–1; Won conference semifinals (Kingston Frontenacs) 4–3; Lost conference finals (Oshawa Generals) 4–0
2025–26	68	45	14	–	5	4	99	0.728	246	194	1st Central	Won conference quarterfinals (Niagara IceDogs) 4–1; Won conference semifinals (Ottawa 67's) 4–1; Won conference finals (Brantford Bulldogs) 4–3; Lost OHL finals (Kitchener Rangers) 4–0

== Uniforms and logos ==
The Barrie Colts logo displays an angry horse holding a hockeystick, surrounded by a horseshoe. The Colts colours are red, white, navy blue & gold. The home uniforms are a white background, with red, navy blue and gold trim. The away uniforms are a navy blue background, with red, white & gold trim. Barrie also briefly used a third jersey which was a red background, with white, navy blue & gold trim.

For the 2007–08 season, the Colts have worn a new third jersey. It has a navy blue blackground with white, red and gold trim along the bottom, with the word "Colts" diagonally across the front. For the 2009–10 season, the colts wore the Rbk Edge uniforms with a new template.

== Arenas ==
The Barrie Colts played at the Barrie Arena during their tenure in the Junior B days and Junior A Tier II days, and also for a portion of their inaugural OHL season until their new arena was completed. The Barrie Arena was located in downtown Barrie and was formerly home to the Barrie Flyers OHA team from 1945 to 1960 and other senior hockey teams. The Arena was torn down in 2008.

Barrie Molson Centre was completed during the early portion of the 1995–96 season. The layout of the arena served as a blueprint for many new OHL arenas built shortly thereafter. The Horsepower Grill restaurant is located at the west end of the arena. The Barrie Molson Centre is located near the southern entrance of Park Place, close to Highway 400. The arena has since been renamed "The Barrie Colts Centre" and then, pursuant to a 10–year naming rights agreement with Paul Sadlon Motors Inc. for $170,121 per year (for a total of $1,701,210), beginning in the Colts' 2021–22 season, the "Sadlon Arena".

== See also ==
- List of ice hockey teams in Ontario
