= Mike Danton =

Canadian-Polish ice hockey player

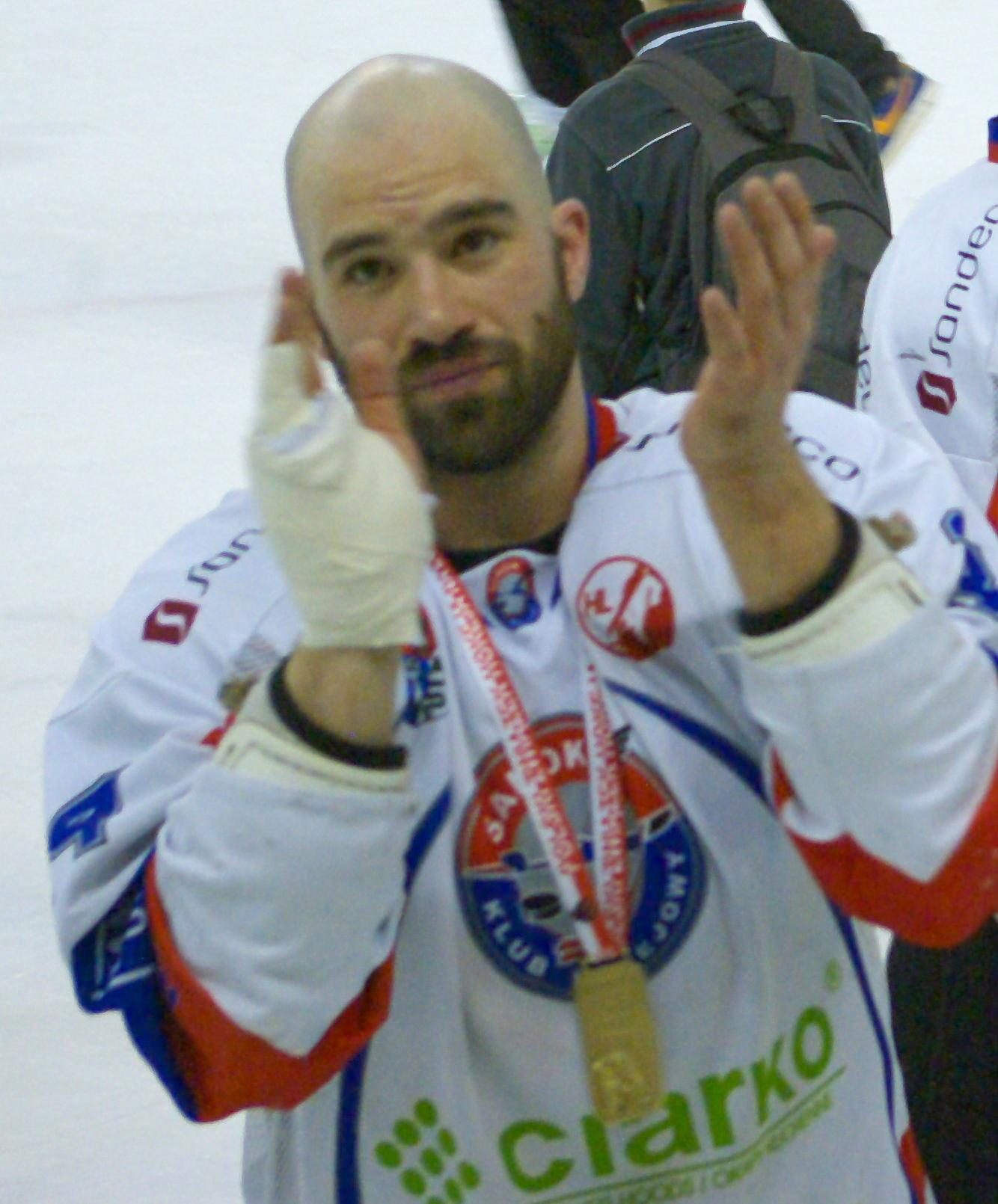
- Danton in 2014
- Born: October 21, 1980 (age 46) Brampton, Ontario, Canada
- Height: 5 ft 9 in (175 cm)
- Weight: 190 lb (86 kg; 13 st 8 lb)
- Position: Centre
- Shot: Right
- Played for: New Jersey Devils; St. Louis Blues; Orli Znojmo; HC ’05 Banská Bystrica; Beibarys Atyrau; HSC Csíkszereda; STS Sanok
- National team: Poland
- NHL draft: 135th overall, 2000; New Jersey Devils
- Playing career: 2000–2004; 2011–2017

Michael Sage Danton (né Jefferson, October 21, 1980) is a Polish-Canadian former professional ice hockey player. He last played for Rivière-du-Loup 3L in the LNAH.

Danton played for the New Jersey Devils and St. Louis Blues of the National Hockey League between 2000 and 2004, before being imprisoned for a conspiracy to commit murder. He was released on parole on September 11, 2009 after 63 months in jail, the original sentence being 90 months.

After being released from prison, he resumed his professional ice hockey career in various European leagues and in North America.

== Junior hockey career ==
Danton was known as Mike Jefferson during his junior hockey career. As a youth, Jefferson played in the 1994 Quebec International Pee-Wee Hockey Tournament with the Toronto Young Nationals minor ice hockey team. He began junior hockey in the 1996–97 season with the Quinte Hawks of the Metro Junior A Hockey League. He played in the Ontario Hockey League from 1997 to 2000 with the Sarnia Sting, the Toronto St. Michael's Majors, and the Barrie Colts. Playing for the Colts during the 2000 Memorial Cup, Jefferson commented that Brad Richards would not last five games in the Ontario Hockey League and later refused to shake Richards' hand after he had been named tournament MVP.

== Professional hockey career (2000–2004) ==
Selected 135th overall by the New Jersey Devils in the 2000 NHL entry draft, Danton was a left winger for the St. Louis Blues, who traded a 3rd round draft pick to New Jersey to obtain him. He played 68 games for the Blues in the 2003–04 season. While with the Devils organization, he changed his last name from Jefferson to Danton after becoming estranged from his family. He admitted he adopted the surname "Danton" from the name of a 13-year-old boy at David Frost's hockey camp, because the name sounded "cool". He also feuded with Devils general manager Lou Lamoriello and was suspended by the team, prompting his eventual trade to St. Louis.

== Arrest and imprisonment (2004–2009) ==
Michael Sage Danton (né Michael Jefferson)
- Occupation: Professional hockey player (2000–2004, 2011–2017)
- Status: Granted parole on September 11, 2009 after serving 62 months, parole ended in 2011
- Conviction: Pleaded guilty on July 16, 2004
- Criminal charge: Conspiracy to commit murder
- Penalty: 90 months in prison: Originally sentenced in the United States; Spent last six months of sentence in a Canadian prison

On April 16, 2004, two days after the Blues were eliminated from the first round of the Stanley Cup Playoffs by the San Jose Sharks, Danton was arrested and charged with conspiracy to commit murder. On July 16, 2004, he pleaded guilty to attempting to hire a hitman, who was actually a police dispatcher, to murder David Frost, his agent, and was sentenced by U.S. District Judge William Stiehl to seven-and-a-half years in a United States federal prison. To this day, however, Frost denies that he was the target. In 2011, Danton claimed in an interview with ESPN that his original target was his estranged father, Steve Jefferson.

In November 2005, the CBC program The Fifth Estate aired a documentary, Rogue Agent, about the history between Danton and Frost. In it, the documentary casts light on the controlling relationship Frost had with Danton and how he encouraged Danton to estrange himself from his parents, as well as an alleged incident where Frost and a group of his players abused Danton's younger brother. The documentary also focuses on a taped telephone call Danton made to Frost a week after his arrest. In it, Frost instructs Danton to plead guilty and ends the conversation demanding Danton say "I love you," which Danton does, further fueling speculation of a homosexual relationship between the two. In 2006, Frost was charged with 12 counts of sexual exploitation related to acts on three females and four young boys between the ages of 14 and 16, alleged to have occurred during the time that Frost was Danton's junior hockey coach, with the Quinte Hawks. Frost was acquitted of all charges on November 28, 2008; the trial included testimony from women who had participated in threesomes with other players and Danton. In an unrelated matter, Frost was also acquitted on February 14, 2009 of fraud charges related to the use of one of Danton's credit cards; Danton stated that Frost had his permission to use the card.

In July 2008, in an article in the Denver Post, it was revealed that Howard Kieffer, the lawyer who represented Danton in his murder conspiracy case, had never graduated from law school, and so was not licensed to practice law. In September 2008, Kieffer pleaded not guilty to two felony charges, and news reports revealed that he would not be representing himself.

On March 19, 2009, the United States Bureau of Prisons granted Danton's request to be transferred to a Canadian prison after five years at FCI Sandstone; he was housed at the Pittsburgh Institution in Joyceville, Ontario. Under Canadian law, Danton was eligible for parole, which was granted on September 11, 2009. Conditions of his parole include no contact with his father (who Danton now claims was the intended target), and no face-to-face meetings with Frost (widely believed to be Danton's actual target).

== University hockey career (2010–2011) ==
Danton took university correspondence courses at Queen's University while imprisoned. In fall 2009 he applied to Saint Mary's University in Halifax, Nova Scotia for January 2010 entry. Danton initially enrolled in three courses for the winter 2010 semester and joined the Saint Mary's Huskies varsity men's hockey team.

On January 27, 2010, Danton played in his first game since being released from prison, and scored a goal for the Saint Mary's Huskies, during their 4–1 loss to the Acadia Axemen, played at the Halifax Forum in Halifax. On January 30, 2010, Danton played for the Huskies during a 5–3 loss to the UPEI Panthers played at the MacLauchlan Arena in Charlottetown. On March 28, 2010, the Huskies defeated the Alberta Golden Bears to win the 2010 University Cup, played in Thunder Bay, Ontario.

It was announced by Canadian Interuniversity Sport on October 4, 2010 that Danton had been named an Academic All-Canadian based on a student CIS athlete achieving a grade point average of 3.7 or higher. Danton achieved a 3.9 GPA overall through the winter and spring semesters as well as summer school, and it was revealed in a media story that his study ethic keeps him in the Patrick Power Library at Saint Mary's until 11pm each night.

== Return to professional hockey (2011–2017) ==
On July 28, 2011, Danton announced on his Twitter account that he had signed with a Swedish professional club for the 2011–12 season. The following day, this was confirmed to be the Division 1 club IFK Ore. The club explained that "We're obviously aware of his background but it was years ago". The club further explained that Danton's playing knowledge was the reason why the club chose to acquire him. The club made him team captain upon his arrival in Sweden.

On September 18, 2011, while playing his first game for Ore, Danton saved teammate and linemate Marcus Bengtsson's life using skills he learned in prison. Following a hard hit, Bengtsson's head struck the ice, and he started convulsing. Danton waited for his teammate's mouth to release before using his hand to prevent Bengtsson from choking on his own tongue. Ore won the game 4–3 against Söderhamn/Ljusne HC. Playing in 27 games, Danton scored 16 goals and 25 assists for a total of 41 points.

On December 17, 2011, following Ore's failure to reach the spring series called "Allettan", Orli Znojmo of the Erste Bank Eishockey Liga announced their signing of Danton. He spent the remainder of the season with the South Moravian club.

On May 20, 2012, Coventry Blaze of the Elite Ice Hockey League announced their signing of Danton, although his place at the club was brought to an abrupt end due to the UK Border Agency twice rejecting his application for a UK entry visa.

On September 29, 2012, after the departure of defenseman Dean Moore and forward Bill Keenan to IF Sundsvall of HockeyAllsvenskan, Kramfors-Alliansen of the Swedish Division 1 league signed Danton to a one-year contract.

On January 9, 2013, Danton signed a contract with the HC ’05 Banská Bystrica in the Slovak Extraliga. He then started the 2013–14 season playing for Beibarys Atyrau in Kazakhstan. After complaining about breaches in his contract, he had it terminated and moved to HSC Csíkszereda in Romania.

On January 24, 2014, Danton signed for Ciarko PBS Bank KH Sanok of the Polish Hockey League, until the end of the season. With Sanok, he won the 2013–14 playoff championship. He re-signed for both the 2014–15 and 2015–16 seasons. Due to financial difficulty, the team did not compete in the 2016–17 season, so Danton went back to North America, signing with Rivière-du-Loup 3L of the LNAH. After one season in the LNAH, he retired from professional hockey.

== Career statistics ==
| | | | Regular season | | | | | Playoffs |
| Season | Team | League | GP | G | A | Pts | PIM | GP | G | A | Pts | PIM |
|---|---|---|---|---|---|---|---|---|---|---|---|---|
| 1996–97 | Bramalea Blues | OPJHL | 6 | 1 | 2 | 3 | 18 | — | — | — | — | — |
| 1996–97 | Quinte Hawks | MetJHL | 35 | 10 | 18 | 28 | 281 | — | — | — | — | — |
| 1997–98 | Sarnia Sting | OHL | 12 | 6 | 1 | 7 | 37 | — | — | — | — | — |
| 1997–98 | Toronto St. Michael's Majors | OHL | 18 | 4 | 6 | 10 | 77 | — | — | — | — | — |
| 1998–99 | Toronto St. Michael's Majors | OHL | 27 | 18 | 22 | 40 | 116 | — | — | — | — | — |
| 1998–99 | Barrie Colts | OHL | 26 | 15 | 20 | 35 | 62 | 9 | 6 | 5 | 11 | 38 |
| 1999–2000 | Barrie Colts | OHL | 58 | 34 | 53 | 87 | 203 | 25 | 7 | 16 | 23 | 107 |
| 2000–01 | Albany River Rats | AHL | 69 | 19 | 15 | 34 | 195 | — | — | — | — | — |
| 2000–01 | New Jersey Devils | NHL | 2 | 0 | 0 | 0 | 6 | — | — | — | — | — |
| 2002–03 | New Jersey Devils | NHL | 17 | 2 | 0 | 2 | 35 | — | — | — | — | — |
| 2003–04 | St. Louis Blues | NHL | 68 | 7 | 5 | 12 | 141 | 5 | 1 | 0 | 1 | 2 |
| 2009–10 | Saint Mary's University | AUS | 7 | 3 | 1 | 4 | 6 | 9 | 6 | 3 | 9 | 6 |
| 2010–11 | Saint Mary's University | AUS | 28 | 3 | 2 | 5 | 30 | 5 | 2 | 0 | 2 | 0 |
| 2011–12 | IFK Ore | SWE.3 | 27 | 16 | 25 | 41 | 54 | — | — | — | — | — |
| 2011–12 | Orli Znojmo | EBEL | 19 | 4 | 5 | 9 | 65 | 4 | 0 | 0 | 0 | 11 |
| 2012–13 | Kramfors–Alliansen | SWE.3 | 22 | 22 | 16 | 38 | 82 | — | — | — | — | — |
| 2012–13 | HC '05 Banská Bystrica | SVK | 14 | 3 | 7 | 10 | 12 | 5 | 0 | 1 | 1 | 18 |
| 2013–14 | Beibarys Atyrau | KAZ | 25 | 4 | 11 | 15 | 57 | — | — | — | — | — |
| 2013–14 | HSC Csíkszereda | MOL | 13 | 2 | 5 | 7 | 14 | — | — | — | — | — |
| 2013–14 | KH Sanok | POL | 11 | 4 | 11 | 15 | 20 | 14 | 1 | 7 | 8 | 16 |
| 2014–15 | KH Sanok | POL | 42 | 18 | 34 | 52 | 166 | 11 | 2 | 6 | 8 | 12 |
| 2015–16 | STS Sanok | POL | 42 | 10 | 26 | 36 | 48 | 13 | 3 | 10 | 13 | 4 |
| 2016–17 | Rivière–du–Loup 3L | LNAH | 24 | 9 | 17 | 26 | 31 | 9 | 1 | 2 | 3 | 4 |
| NHL totals | | | 87 | 9 | 5 | 14 | 182 | 5 | 1 | 0 | 1 | 2 |
| POL totals | | | 95 | 32 | 71 | 103 | 234 | 38 | 6 | 23 | 29 | 32 |
