= Ryan Barnes =

Canadian ice hockey player (born 1980)

- Born: January 30, 1980 (age 46) Dunnville, Ontario, Canada
- Height: 6 ft 1 in (185 cm)
- Weight: 220 lb (100 kg; 15 st 10 lb)
- Position: Left wing
- Shot: Left
- Played for: Detroit Red Wings
- NHL draft: 55th overall, 1998; Detroit Red Wings
- Playing career: 2000–2007

Ryan Donald Barnes (born January 30, 1980) is a Canadian former professional ice hockey left winger who played two games in the National Hockey League with the Detroit Red Wings during the 2003–04 season. The rest of his career, which lasted from 2000 to 2007, was spent in various minor leagues.

Barnes was drafted in the second round, fifty-fifth overall in the 1998 NHL entry draft by the Detroit Red Wings. Barnes played his junior career for three teams in the OHL; the Sudbury Wolves, the Toronto St. Michael's Majors and finally the Barrie Colts. On October 3, 1999, he was suspended from the OHL for 25 games for a stick-swinging incident in a game against Oshawa Generals. At the end of that season, he played with the Barrie Colts in the Memorial Cup Championship final.

He has played two career games in the National Hockey League, as a member of the Detroit Red Wings.

After retiring as a player, Barnes worked as a coach, starting in the 2007–08 season with the Port Colborne Sailors of the Greater Ontario Junior Hockey League. Barnes was hired to work as an assistant coach with the Peterborough Petes for the 2008–09 season.

== Career statistics ==
=== Regular season and playoffs ===
			Regular season					Playoffs
Season	Team	League	GP	G	A	Pts	PIM	GP	G	A	Pts	PIM
1995–96	Welland Cougars	GHL	40	5	8	13	50	—	—	—	—	—
1996–97	Quinte Hawks	MetJAHL	46	15	19	34	245	—	—	—	—	—
1997–98	Sudbury Wolves	OHL	46	13	18	31	111	10	0	2	2	24
1998–99	Sudbury Wolves	OHL	8	2	0	2	23	—	—	—	—	—
1998–99	Toronto St. Michael's Majors	OHL	31	11	14	25	215	—	—	—	—	—
1998–99	Barrie Colts	OHL	24	16	14	30	161	12	2	4	6	40
1999–00	Barrie Colts	OHL	31	17	12	29	98	25	7	7	14	49
1999–00	Barrie Colts	M-Cup	—	—	—	—	—	5	1	1	2	4
2000–01	Cincinnati Mighty Ducks	AHL	1	0	0	0	7	—	—	—	—	—
2000–01	Toledo Storm	ECHL	16	2	4	6	31	—	—	—	—	—
2001–02	Cincinnati Mighty Ducks	AHL	46	2	3	5	152	—	—	—	—	—
2001–02	Toledo Storm	ECHL	1	1	0	1	0	—	—	—	—	—
2002–03	Grand Rapids Griffins	AHL	73	5	6	11	151	15	1	1	2	17
2003–04	Detroit Red Wings	NHL	2	0	0	0	0	—	—	—	—	—
2003–04	Grand Rapids Griffins	AHL	69	6	13	19	175	4	0	0	0	7
2004–05	Grand Rapids Griffins	AHL	69	7	8	15	167	—	—	—	—	—
2004–05	Kalamazoo Wings	UHL	11	3	5	8	4	—	—	—	—	—
2005–06	Hamilton Bulldogs	AHL	7	0	0	0	9	—	—	—	—	—
2005–06	Danbury Trashers	UHL	32	8	19	27	114	17	0	2	2	37
2006–07	Muskegon Fury	UHL	38	6	9	15	115	11	3	1	4	14
AHL totals			265	20	30	50	661	19	1	1	2	24
NHL totals			2	0	0	0	0	—	—	—	—	—
